

526001–526100 

|-bgcolor=#d6d6d6
| 526001 ||  || — || October 25, 2005 || Kitt Peak || Spacewatch ||  || align=right | 2.8 km || 
|-id=002 bgcolor=#E9E9E9
| 526002 ||  || — || October 25, 2005 || Kitt Peak || Spacewatch ||  || align=right data-sort-value="0.69" | 690 m || 
|-id=003 bgcolor=#E9E9E9
| 526003 ||  || — || October 25, 2005 || Catalina || CSS ||  || align=right | 1.2 km || 
|-id=004 bgcolor=#d6d6d6
| 526004 ||  || — || October 25, 2005 || Kitt Peak || Spacewatch ||  || align=right | 4.7 km || 
|-id=005 bgcolor=#d6d6d6
| 526005 ||  || — || October 25, 2005 || Kitt Peak || Spacewatch ||  || align=right | 3.0 km || 
|-id=006 bgcolor=#d6d6d6
| 526006 ||  || — || October 28, 2005 || Mount Lemmon || Mount Lemmon Survey ||  || align=right | 3.1 km || 
|-id=007 bgcolor=#E9E9E9
| 526007 ||  || — || October 28, 2005 || Mount Lemmon || Mount Lemmon Survey ||  || align=right | 1.4 km || 
|-id=008 bgcolor=#fefefe
| 526008 ||  || — || October 28, 2005 || Mount Lemmon || Mount Lemmon Survey ||  || align=right data-sort-value="0.68" | 680 m || 
|-id=009 bgcolor=#fefefe
| 526009 ||  || — || October 26, 2005 || Anderson Mesa || LONEOS ||  || align=right data-sort-value="0.79" | 790 m || 
|-id=010 bgcolor=#fefefe
| 526010 ||  || — || October 29, 2005 || Catalina || CSS || H || align=right data-sort-value="0.52" | 520 m || 
|-id=011 bgcolor=#fefefe
| 526011 ||  || — || October 25, 2005 || Mount Lemmon || Mount Lemmon Survey || H || align=right data-sort-value="0.47" | 470 m || 
|-id=012 bgcolor=#d6d6d6
| 526012 ||  || — || October 25, 2005 || Kitt Peak || Spacewatch ||  || align=right | 2.5 km || 
|-id=013 bgcolor=#fefefe
| 526013 ||  || — || October 25, 2005 || Kitt Peak || Spacewatch || H || align=right data-sort-value="0.49" | 490 m || 
|-id=014 bgcolor=#E9E9E9
| 526014 ||  || — || October 25, 2005 || Mount Lemmon || Mount Lemmon Survey ||  || align=right | 1.6 km || 
|-id=015 bgcolor=#E9E9E9
| 526015 ||  || — || October 26, 2005 || Kitt Peak || Spacewatch ||  || align=right | 1.2 km || 
|-id=016 bgcolor=#E9E9E9
| 526016 ||  || — || October 27, 2005 || Kitt Peak || Spacewatch ||  || align=right | 1.4 km || 
|-id=017 bgcolor=#E9E9E9
| 526017 ||  || — || October 28, 2005 || Kitt Peak || Spacewatch ||  || align=right | 1.5 km || 
|-id=018 bgcolor=#d6d6d6
| 526018 ||  || — || October 28, 2005 || Mount Lemmon || Mount Lemmon Survey ||  || align=right | 2.5 km || 
|-id=019 bgcolor=#d6d6d6
| 526019 ||  || — || October 28, 2005 || Mount Lemmon || Mount Lemmon Survey ||  || align=right | 3.2 km || 
|-id=020 bgcolor=#d6d6d6
| 526020 ||  || — || October 24, 2005 || Kitt Peak || Spacewatch || EOS || align=right | 1.6 km || 
|-id=021 bgcolor=#d6d6d6
| 526021 ||  || — || October 25, 2005 || Mount Lemmon || Mount Lemmon Survey || EOS || align=right | 1.3 km || 
|-id=022 bgcolor=#E9E9E9
| 526022 ||  || — || September 25, 2005 || Kitt Peak || Spacewatch ||  || align=right | 1.2 km || 
|-id=023 bgcolor=#E9E9E9
| 526023 ||  || — || October 26, 2005 || Kitt Peak || Spacewatch ||  || align=right | 1.3 km || 
|-id=024 bgcolor=#d6d6d6
| 526024 ||  || — || October 10, 1994 || Kitt Peak || Spacewatch ||  || align=right | 3.5 km || 
|-id=025 bgcolor=#d6d6d6
| 526025 ||  || — || October 26, 2005 || Kitt Peak || Spacewatch ||  || align=right | 2.7 km || 
|-id=026 bgcolor=#fefefe
| 526026 ||  || — || October 26, 2005 || Kitt Peak || Spacewatch ||  || align=right data-sort-value="0.70" | 700 m || 
|-id=027 bgcolor=#d6d6d6
| 526027 ||  || — || October 26, 2005 || Kitt Peak || Spacewatch || 7:4 || align=right | 2.9 km || 
|-id=028 bgcolor=#d6d6d6
| 526028 ||  || — || October 26, 2005 || Kitt Peak || Spacewatch ||  || align=right | 2.6 km || 
|-id=029 bgcolor=#d6d6d6
| 526029 ||  || — || October 26, 2005 || Kitt Peak || Spacewatch || EOS || align=right | 1.6 km || 
|-id=030 bgcolor=#E9E9E9
| 526030 ||  || — || October 26, 2005 || Kitt Peak || Spacewatch ||  || align=right | 1.4 km || 
|-id=031 bgcolor=#fefefe
| 526031 ||  || — || October 26, 2005 || Kitt Peak || Spacewatch ||  || align=right data-sort-value="0.98" | 980 m || 
|-id=032 bgcolor=#E9E9E9
| 526032 ||  || — || October 26, 2005 || Kitt Peak || Spacewatch ||  || align=right | 1.8 km || 
|-id=033 bgcolor=#fefefe
| 526033 ||  || — || October 26, 2005 || Kitt Peak || Spacewatch ||  || align=right data-sort-value="0.47" | 470 m || 
|-id=034 bgcolor=#d6d6d6
| 526034 ||  || — || October 26, 2005 || Kitt Peak || Spacewatch ||  || align=right | 2.9 km || 
|-id=035 bgcolor=#E9E9E9
| 526035 ||  || — || October 26, 2005 || Kitt Peak || Spacewatch ||  || align=right | 1.3 km || 
|-id=036 bgcolor=#E9E9E9
| 526036 ||  || — || October 26, 2005 || Kitt Peak || Spacewatch ||  || align=right | 1.8 km || 
|-id=037 bgcolor=#E9E9E9
| 526037 ||  || — || October 26, 2005 || Kitt Peak || Spacewatch ||  || align=right | 1.0 km || 
|-id=038 bgcolor=#E9E9E9
| 526038 ||  || — || October 28, 2005 || Catalina || CSS ||  || align=right | 1.3 km || 
|-id=039 bgcolor=#E9E9E9
| 526039 ||  || — || October 25, 2005 || Kitt Peak || Spacewatch ||  || align=right data-sort-value="0.96" | 960 m || 
|-id=040 bgcolor=#E9E9E9
| 526040 ||  || — || October 25, 2005 || Kitt Peak || Spacewatch ||  || align=right | 1.3 km || 
|-id=041 bgcolor=#E9E9E9
| 526041 ||  || — || October 27, 2005 || Kitt Peak || Spacewatch ||  || align=right | 1.0 km || 
|-id=042 bgcolor=#E9E9E9
| 526042 ||  || — || October 27, 2005 || Mount Lemmon || Mount Lemmon Survey ||  || align=right | 1.1 km || 
|-id=043 bgcolor=#E9E9E9
| 526043 ||  || — || October 11, 2005 || Kitt Peak || Spacewatch ||  || align=right data-sort-value="0.81" | 810 m || 
|-id=044 bgcolor=#E9E9E9
| 526044 ||  || — || October 28, 2005 || Mount Lemmon || Mount Lemmon Survey ||  || align=right | 1.1 km || 
|-id=045 bgcolor=#E9E9E9
| 526045 ||  || — || September 29, 2005 || Catalina || CSS ||  || align=right | 1.4 km || 
|-id=046 bgcolor=#E9E9E9
| 526046 ||  || — || October 29, 2005 || Mount Lemmon || Mount Lemmon Survey ||  || align=right | 1.1 km || 
|-id=047 bgcolor=#E9E9E9
| 526047 ||  || — || October 22, 2005 || Kitt Peak || Spacewatch ||  || align=right | 1.6 km || 
|-id=048 bgcolor=#d6d6d6
| 526048 ||  || — || October 29, 2005 || Mount Lemmon || Mount Lemmon Survey ||  || align=right | 2.1 km || 
|-id=049 bgcolor=#fefefe
| 526049 ||  || — || October 29, 2005 || Mount Lemmon || Mount Lemmon Survey || H || align=right data-sort-value="0.67" | 670 m || 
|-id=050 bgcolor=#fefefe
| 526050 ||  || — || October 1, 2005 || Mount Lemmon || Mount Lemmon Survey ||  || align=right data-sort-value="0.87" | 870 m || 
|-id=051 bgcolor=#d6d6d6
| 526051 ||  || — || October 31, 2005 || Kitt Peak || Spacewatch ||  || align=right | 4.4 km || 
|-id=052 bgcolor=#fefefe
| 526052 ||  || — || October 31, 2005 || Kitt Peak || Spacewatch ||  || align=right data-sort-value="0.61" | 610 m || 
|-id=053 bgcolor=#E9E9E9
| 526053 ||  || — || October 31, 2005 || Kitt Peak || Spacewatch ||  || align=right | 1.2 km || 
|-id=054 bgcolor=#E9E9E9
| 526054 ||  || — || October 31, 2005 || Kitt Peak || Spacewatch ||  || align=right | 1.0 km || 
|-id=055 bgcolor=#E9E9E9
| 526055 ||  || — || October 29, 2005 || Kitt Peak || Spacewatch ||  || align=right data-sort-value="0.81" | 810 m || 
|-id=056 bgcolor=#E9E9E9
| 526056 ||  || — || October 29, 2005 || Mount Lemmon || Mount Lemmon Survey ||  || align=right | 1.8 km || 
|-id=057 bgcolor=#E9E9E9
| 526057 ||  || — || October 29, 2005 || Mount Lemmon || Mount Lemmon Survey ||  || align=right | 1.3 km || 
|-id=058 bgcolor=#fefefe
| 526058 ||  || — || October 29, 2005 || Catalina || CSS ||  || align=right data-sort-value="0.75" | 750 m || 
|-id=059 bgcolor=#E9E9E9
| 526059 ||  || — || October 29, 2005 || Catalina || CSS ||  || align=right | 1.5 km || 
|-id=060 bgcolor=#E9E9E9
| 526060 ||  || — || October 22, 2005 || Kitt Peak || Spacewatch ||  || align=right | 1.3 km || 
|-id=061 bgcolor=#E9E9E9
| 526061 ||  || — || October 29, 2005 || Mount Lemmon || Mount Lemmon Survey ||  || align=right | 1.5 km || 
|-id=062 bgcolor=#fefefe
| 526062 ||  || — || October 25, 2005 || Kitt Peak || Spacewatch ||  || align=right data-sort-value="0.95" | 950 m || 
|-id=063 bgcolor=#E9E9E9
| 526063 ||  || — || September 30, 2005 || Mount Lemmon || Mount Lemmon Survey ||  || align=right data-sort-value="0.81" | 810 m || 
|-id=064 bgcolor=#E9E9E9
| 526064 ||  || — || October 27, 2005 || Kitt Peak || Spacewatch ||  || align=right data-sort-value="0.99" | 990 m || 
|-id=065 bgcolor=#E9E9E9
| 526065 ||  || — || October 27, 2005 || Kitt Peak || Spacewatch ||  || align=right data-sort-value="0.68" | 680 m || 
|-id=066 bgcolor=#E9E9E9
| 526066 ||  || — || October 27, 2005 || Kitt Peak || Spacewatch ||  || align=right data-sort-value="0.94" | 940 m || 
|-id=067 bgcolor=#E9E9E9
| 526067 ||  || — || October 27, 2005 || Kitt Peak || Spacewatch ||  || align=right | 1.1 km || 
|-id=068 bgcolor=#E9E9E9
| 526068 ||  || — || October 27, 2005 || Mount Lemmon || Mount Lemmon Survey ||  || align=right | 1.4 km || 
|-id=069 bgcolor=#d6d6d6
| 526069 ||  || — || October 27, 2005 || Kitt Peak || Spacewatch ||  || align=right | 3.5 km || 
|-id=070 bgcolor=#d6d6d6
| 526070 ||  || — || October 27, 2005 || Kitt Peak || Spacewatch ||  || align=right | 2.3 km || 
|-id=071 bgcolor=#E9E9E9
| 526071 ||  || — || October 27, 2005 || Kitt Peak || Spacewatch ||  || align=right data-sort-value="0.77" | 770 m || 
|-id=072 bgcolor=#E9E9E9
| 526072 ||  || — || October 27, 2005 || Kitt Peak || Spacewatch ||  || align=right | 1.4 km || 
|-id=073 bgcolor=#fefefe
| 526073 ||  || — || March 15, 2004 || Kitt Peak || Spacewatch ||  || align=right data-sort-value="0.65" | 650 m || 
|-id=074 bgcolor=#d6d6d6
| 526074 ||  || — || October 27, 2005 || Kitt Peak || Spacewatch ||  || align=right | 2.9 km || 
|-id=075 bgcolor=#E9E9E9
| 526075 ||  || — || October 27, 2005 || Kitt Peak || Spacewatch ||  || align=right data-sort-value="0.93" | 930 m || 
|-id=076 bgcolor=#d6d6d6
| 526076 ||  || — || October 29, 2005 || Mount Lemmon || Mount Lemmon Survey ||  || align=right | 3.9 km || 
|-id=077 bgcolor=#E9E9E9
| 526077 ||  || — || October 28, 2005 || Catalina || CSS ||  || align=right | 1.5 km || 
|-id=078 bgcolor=#E9E9E9
| 526078 ||  || — || October 29, 2005 || Catalina || CSS ||  || align=right | 1.7 km || 
|-id=079 bgcolor=#d6d6d6
| 526079 ||  || — || October 27, 2005 || Catalina || CSS ||  || align=right | 3.4 km || 
|-id=080 bgcolor=#fefefe
| 526080 ||  || — || October 27, 2005 || Kitt Peak || Spacewatch ||  || align=right data-sort-value="0.86" | 860 m || 
|-id=081 bgcolor=#d6d6d6
| 526081 ||  || — || October 23, 2005 || Kitt Peak || Spacewatch ||  || align=right | 2.1 km || 
|-id=082 bgcolor=#fefefe
| 526082 ||  || — || October 30, 2005 || Catalina || CSS ||  || align=right data-sort-value="0.61" | 610 m || 
|-id=083 bgcolor=#E9E9E9
| 526083 ||  || — || October 31, 2005 || Mount Lemmon || Mount Lemmon Survey ||  || align=right data-sort-value="0.91" | 910 m || 
|-id=084 bgcolor=#E9E9E9
| 526084 ||  || — || October 31, 2005 || Socorro || LINEAR ||  || align=right | 1.5 km || 
|-id=085 bgcolor=#E9E9E9
| 526085 ||  || — || October 31, 2005 || Mount Lemmon || Mount Lemmon Survey ||  || align=right data-sort-value="0.98" | 980 m || 
|-id=086 bgcolor=#E9E9E9
| 526086 ||  || — || October 25, 2005 || Kitt Peak || Spacewatch ||  || align=right | 1.1 km || 
|-id=087 bgcolor=#E9E9E9
| 526087 ||  || — || October 25, 2005 || Kitt Peak || Spacewatch ||  || align=right | 1.4 km || 
|-id=088 bgcolor=#E9E9E9
| 526088 ||  || — || October 25, 2005 || Kitt Peak || Spacewatch ||  || align=right data-sort-value="0.87" | 870 m || 
|-id=089 bgcolor=#E9E9E9
| 526089 ||  || — || October 25, 2005 || Kitt Peak || Spacewatch ||  || align=right data-sort-value="0.94" | 940 m || 
|-id=090 bgcolor=#d6d6d6
| 526090 ||  || — || October 25, 2005 || Kitt Peak || Spacewatch ||  || align=right | 3.1 km || 
|-id=091 bgcolor=#E9E9E9
| 526091 ||  || — || October 25, 2005 || Mount Lemmon || Mount Lemmon Survey ||  || align=right | 2.1 km || 
|-id=092 bgcolor=#E9E9E9
| 526092 ||  || — || October 1, 2005 || Mount Lemmon || Mount Lemmon Survey ||  || align=right data-sort-value="0.63" | 630 m || 
|-id=093 bgcolor=#E9E9E9
| 526093 ||  || — || October 25, 2005 || Kitt Peak || Spacewatch ||  || align=right data-sort-value="0.62" | 620 m || 
|-id=094 bgcolor=#E9E9E9
| 526094 ||  || — || October 28, 2005 || Kitt Peak || Spacewatch ||  || align=right | 1.1 km || 
|-id=095 bgcolor=#d6d6d6
| 526095 ||  || — || October 28, 2005 || Kitt Peak || Spacewatch ||  || align=right | 3.2 km || 
|-id=096 bgcolor=#E9E9E9
| 526096 ||  || — || October 28, 2005 || Kitt Peak || Spacewatch ||  || align=right | 1.2 km || 
|-id=097 bgcolor=#E9E9E9
| 526097 ||  || — || October 29, 2005 || Kitt Peak || Spacewatch ||  || align=right | 1.6 km || 
|-id=098 bgcolor=#E9E9E9
| 526098 ||  || — || October 7, 2005 || Mount Lemmon || Mount Lemmon Survey ||  || align=right | 1.2 km || 
|-id=099 bgcolor=#fefefe
| 526099 ||  || — || October 29, 2005 || Mount Lemmon || Mount Lemmon Survey ||  || align=right data-sort-value="0.71" | 710 m || 
|-id=100 bgcolor=#fefefe
| 526100 ||  || — || October 29, 2005 || Kitt Peak || Spacewatch || H || align=right data-sort-value="0.91" | 910 m || 
|}

526101–526200 

|-bgcolor=#E9E9E9
| 526101 ||  || — || October 29, 2005 || Kitt Peak || Spacewatch ||  || align=right | 1.4 km || 
|-id=102 bgcolor=#E9E9E9
| 526102 ||  || — || September 30, 2005 || Mount Lemmon || Mount Lemmon Survey ||  || align=right | 2.1 km || 
|-id=103 bgcolor=#fefefe
| 526103 ||  || — || October 30, 2005 || Mount Lemmon || Mount Lemmon Survey ||  || align=right data-sort-value="0.65" | 650 m || 
|-id=104 bgcolor=#E9E9E9
| 526104 ||  || — || October 22, 2005 || Catalina || CSS ||  || align=right | 1.5 km || 
|-id=105 bgcolor=#E9E9E9
| 526105 ||  || — || October 31, 2005 || Mount Lemmon || Mount Lemmon Survey ||  || align=right | 1.9 km || 
|-id=106 bgcolor=#fefefe
| 526106 ||  || — || October 30, 2005 || Catalina || CSS ||  || align=right data-sort-value="0.62" | 620 m || 
|-id=107 bgcolor=#E9E9E9
| 526107 ||  || — || October 30, 2005 || Socorro || LINEAR || (1547) || align=right | 1.3 km || 
|-id=108 bgcolor=#fefefe
| 526108 ||  || — || October 27, 2005 || Mount Lemmon || Mount Lemmon Survey ||  || align=right data-sort-value="0.78" | 780 m || 
|-id=109 bgcolor=#d6d6d6
| 526109 ||  || — || October 28, 2005 || Kitt Peak || Spacewatch ||  || align=right | 2.0 km || 
|-id=110 bgcolor=#E9E9E9
| 526110 ||  || — || October 29, 2005 || Kitt Peak || Spacewatch ||  || align=right data-sort-value="0.96" | 960 m || 
|-id=111 bgcolor=#FA8072
| 526111 ||  || — || October 8, 2005 || Socorro || LINEAR ||  || align=right data-sort-value="0.71" | 710 m || 
|-id=112 bgcolor=#E9E9E9
| 526112 ||  || — || October 30, 2005 || Catalina || CSS ||  || align=right data-sort-value="0.97" | 970 m || 
|-id=113 bgcolor=#d6d6d6
| 526113 ||  || — || October 30, 2005 || Mount Lemmon || Mount Lemmon Survey ||  || align=right | 2.8 km || 
|-id=114 bgcolor=#d6d6d6
| 526114 ||  || — || October 30, 2005 || Mount Lemmon || Mount Lemmon Survey ||  || align=right | 2.6 km || 
|-id=115 bgcolor=#d6d6d6
| 526115 ||  || — || October 27, 2005 || Mount Lemmon || Mount Lemmon Survey ||  || align=right | 2.9 km || 
|-id=116 bgcolor=#E9E9E9
| 526116 ||  || — || October 1, 2005 || Mount Lemmon || Mount Lemmon Survey ||  || align=right | 1.1 km || 
|-id=117 bgcolor=#E9E9E9
| 526117 ||  || — || October 7, 2005 || Mount Lemmon || Mount Lemmon Survey ||  || align=right | 1.3 km || 
|-id=118 bgcolor=#d6d6d6
| 526118 ||  || — || October 30, 2005 || Kitt Peak || Spacewatch ||  || align=right | 2.8 km || 
|-id=119 bgcolor=#fefefe
| 526119 ||  || — || October 30, 2005 || Kitt Peak || Spacewatch ||  || align=right | 1.1 km || 
|-id=120 bgcolor=#fefefe
| 526120 ||  || — || October 30, 2005 || Kitt Peak || Spacewatch ||  || align=right data-sort-value="0.91" | 910 m || 
|-id=121 bgcolor=#d6d6d6
| 526121 ||  || — || October 30, 2005 || Kitt Peak || Spacewatch ||  || align=right | 2.9 km || 
|-id=122 bgcolor=#d6d6d6
| 526122 ||  || — || October 30, 2005 || Kitt Peak || Spacewatch ||  || align=right | 2.1 km || 
|-id=123 bgcolor=#fefefe
| 526123 ||  || — || October 30, 2005 || Kitt Peak || Spacewatch ||  || align=right data-sort-value="0.46" | 460 m || 
|-id=124 bgcolor=#E9E9E9
| 526124 ||  || — || October 22, 2005 || Kitt Peak || Spacewatch ||  || align=right | 1.2 km || 
|-id=125 bgcolor=#E9E9E9
| 526125 ||  || — || October 22, 2005 || Catalina || CSS ||  || align=right | 1.3 km || 
|-id=126 bgcolor=#E9E9E9
| 526126 ||  || — || October 22, 2005 || Catalina || CSS ||  || align=right | 1.5 km || 
|-id=127 bgcolor=#E9E9E9
| 526127 ||  || — || October 10, 2005 || Catalina || CSS || JUN || align=right data-sort-value="0.74" | 740 m || 
|-id=128 bgcolor=#E9E9E9
| 526128 ||  || — || October 27, 2005 || Catalina || CSS ||  || align=right | 1.5 km || 
|-id=129 bgcolor=#E9E9E9
| 526129 ||  || — || October 1, 2005 || Catalina || CSS || ADE || align=right | 1.9 km || 
|-id=130 bgcolor=#fefefe
| 526130 ||  || — || October 26, 2005 || Apache Point || A. C. Becker || MAS || align=right data-sort-value="0.62" | 620 m || 
|-id=131 bgcolor=#E9E9E9
| 526131 ||  || — || October 27, 2005 || Mount Lemmon || Mount Lemmon Survey ||  || align=right | 2.1 km || 
|-id=132 bgcolor=#E9E9E9
| 526132 ||  || — || October 28, 2005 || Mount Lemmon || Mount Lemmon Survey ||  || align=right | 1.3 km || 
|-id=133 bgcolor=#fefefe
| 526133 ||  || — || October 27, 2005 || Kitt Peak || Spacewatch ||  || align=right data-sort-value="0.42" | 420 m || 
|-id=134 bgcolor=#E9E9E9
| 526134 ||  || — || October 29, 2005 || Mount Lemmon || Mount Lemmon Survey ||  || align=right | 1.8 km || 
|-id=135 bgcolor=#E9E9E9
| 526135 ||  || — || October 25, 2005 || Mount Lemmon || Mount Lemmon Survey ||  || align=right | 1.3 km || 
|-id=136 bgcolor=#fefefe
| 526136 ||  || — || October 25, 2005 || Mount Lemmon || Mount Lemmon Survey ||  || align=right data-sort-value="0.60" | 600 m || 
|-id=137 bgcolor=#E9E9E9
| 526137 ||  || — || October 28, 2005 || Catalina || CSS ||  || align=right | 2.0 km || 
|-id=138 bgcolor=#E9E9E9
| 526138 ||  || — || October 5, 2005 || Catalina || CSS ||  || align=right data-sort-value="0.80" | 800 m || 
|-id=139 bgcolor=#fefefe
| 526139 ||  || — || October 28, 2005 || Mount Lemmon || Mount Lemmon Survey ||  || align=right data-sort-value="0.55" | 550 m || 
|-id=140 bgcolor=#fefefe
| 526140 ||  || — || September 30, 2005 || Catalina || CSS || H || align=right data-sort-value="0.67" | 670 m || 
|-id=141 bgcolor=#E9E9E9
| 526141 ||  || — || November 8, 2005 || Piszkéstető || K. Sárneczky ||  || align=right data-sort-value="0.74" | 740 m || 
|-id=142 bgcolor=#E9E9E9
| 526142 ||  || — || October 25, 2005 || Kitt Peak || Spacewatch ||  || align=right | 1.1 km || 
|-id=143 bgcolor=#E9E9E9
| 526143 ||  || — || November 1, 2005 || Kitt Peak || Spacewatch ||  || align=right | 1.3 km || 
|-id=144 bgcolor=#E9E9E9
| 526144 ||  || — || October 31, 2005 || Socorro || LINEAR ||  || align=right | 1.4 km || 
|-id=145 bgcolor=#E9E9E9
| 526145 ||  || — || October 6, 2005 || Mount Lemmon || Mount Lemmon Survey ||  || align=right | 1.0 km || 
|-id=146 bgcolor=#E9E9E9
| 526146 ||  || — || November 3, 2005 || Mount Lemmon || Mount Lemmon Survey ||  || align=right | 2.0 km || 
|-id=147 bgcolor=#E9E9E9
| 526147 ||  || — || October 25, 2005 || Kitt Peak || Spacewatch ||  || align=right | 1.3 km || 
|-id=148 bgcolor=#d6d6d6
| 526148 ||  || — || October 23, 2005 || Catalina || CSS ||  || align=right | 3.2 km || 
|-id=149 bgcolor=#E9E9E9
| 526149 ||  || — || October 22, 2005 || Catalina || CSS ||  || align=right | 1.8 km || 
|-id=150 bgcolor=#E9E9E9
| 526150 ||  || — || November 1, 2005 || Mount Lemmon || Mount Lemmon Survey ||  || align=right data-sort-value="0.96" | 960 m || 
|-id=151 bgcolor=#E9E9E9
| 526151 ||  || — || October 29, 2005 || Catalina || CSS ||  || align=right | 1.8 km || 
|-id=152 bgcolor=#E9E9E9
| 526152 ||  || — || November 3, 2005 || Mount Lemmon || Mount Lemmon Survey ||  || align=right | 1.1 km || 
|-id=153 bgcolor=#fefefe
| 526153 ||  || — || October 25, 2005 || Mount Lemmon || Mount Lemmon Survey || H || align=right data-sort-value="0.43" | 430 m || 
|-id=154 bgcolor=#E9E9E9
| 526154 ||  || — || November 10, 2005 || Catalina || CSS ||  || align=right | 1.9 km || 
|-id=155 bgcolor=#E9E9E9
| 526155 ||  || — || October 10, 2005 || Catalina || CSS ||  || align=right | 2.4 km || 
|-id=156 bgcolor=#E9E9E9
| 526156 ||  || — || October 3, 2005 || Catalina || CSS ||  || align=right | 1.3 km || 
|-id=157 bgcolor=#E9E9E9
| 526157 ||  || — || October 24, 2005 || Kitt Peak || Spacewatch || WIT || align=right data-sort-value="0.82" | 820 m || 
|-id=158 bgcolor=#fefefe
| 526158 ||  || — || November 6, 2005 || Mount Lemmon || Mount Lemmon Survey || H || align=right data-sort-value="0.62" | 620 m || 
|-id=159 bgcolor=#E9E9E9
| 526159 ||  || — || November 10, 2005 || Catalina || CSS ||  || align=right data-sort-value="0.86" | 860 m || 
|-id=160 bgcolor=#E9E9E9
| 526160 ||  || — || November 3, 2005 || Kitt Peak || Spacewatch ||  || align=right | 1.0 km || 
|-id=161 bgcolor=#fefefe
| 526161 ||  || — || November 1, 2005 || Mount Lemmon || Mount Lemmon Survey ||  || align=right | 1.2 km || 
|-id=162 bgcolor=#fefefe
| 526162 ||  || — || November 1, 2005 || Mount Lemmon || Mount Lemmon Survey ||  || align=right data-sort-value="0.93" | 930 m || 
|-id=163 bgcolor=#fefefe
| 526163 ||  || — || November 1, 2005 || Mount Lemmon || Mount Lemmon Survey ||  || align=right data-sort-value="0.80" | 800 m || 
|-id=164 bgcolor=#E9E9E9
| 526164 ||  || — || November 3, 2005 || Catalina || CSS ||  || align=right | 1.7 km || 
|-id=165 bgcolor=#E9E9E9
| 526165 ||  || — || November 2, 2005 || Catalina || CSS ||  || align=right | 1.1 km || 
|-id=166 bgcolor=#d6d6d6
| 526166 ||  || — || October 25, 2005 || Mount Lemmon || Mount Lemmon Survey ||  || align=right | 2.3 km || 
|-id=167 bgcolor=#E9E9E9
| 526167 ||  || — || November 22, 2005 || Kitt Peak || Spacewatch ||  || align=right | 1.2 km || 
|-id=168 bgcolor=#fefefe
| 526168 ||  || — || November 3, 2005 || Kitt Peak || Spacewatch ||  || align=right data-sort-value="0.47" | 470 m || 
|-id=169 bgcolor=#fefefe
| 526169 ||  || — || November 21, 2005 || Kitt Peak || Spacewatch ||  || align=right data-sort-value="0.49" | 490 m || 
|-id=170 bgcolor=#E9E9E9
| 526170 ||  || — || November 12, 2005 || Kitt Peak || Spacewatch ||  || align=right | 1.2 km || 
|-id=171 bgcolor=#E9E9E9
| 526171 ||  || — || November 21, 2005 || Kitt Peak || Spacewatch ||  || align=right | 1.2 km || 
|-id=172 bgcolor=#E9E9E9
| 526172 ||  || — || November 21, 2005 || Kitt Peak || Spacewatch ||  || align=right data-sort-value="0.94" | 940 m || 
|-id=173 bgcolor=#E9E9E9
| 526173 ||  || — || November 21, 2005 || Kitt Peak || Spacewatch ||  || align=right data-sort-value="0.92" | 920 m || 
|-id=174 bgcolor=#FA8072
| 526174 ||  || — || November 11, 2005 || Campo Imperatore || CINEOS ||  || align=right data-sort-value="0.52" | 520 m || 
|-id=175 bgcolor=#E9E9E9
| 526175 ||  || — || November 21, 2005 || Kitt Peak || Spacewatch ||  || align=right | 1.7 km || 
|-id=176 bgcolor=#E9E9E9
| 526176 ||  || — || November 21, 2005 || Kitt Peak || Spacewatch ||  || align=right | 1.2 km || 
|-id=177 bgcolor=#d6d6d6
| 526177 ||  || — || November 21, 2005 || Kitt Peak || Spacewatch ||  || align=right | 2.8 km || 
|-id=178 bgcolor=#d6d6d6
| 526178 ||  || — || November 22, 2005 || Kitt Peak || Spacewatch ||  || align=right | 3.4 km || 
|-id=179 bgcolor=#E9E9E9
| 526179 ||  || — || November 21, 2005 || Kitt Peak || Spacewatch ||  || align=right data-sort-value="0.97" | 970 m || 
|-id=180 bgcolor=#E9E9E9
| 526180 ||  || — || October 28, 2005 || Mount Lemmon || Mount Lemmon Survey ||  || align=right | 1.0 km || 
|-id=181 bgcolor=#FA8072
| 526181 ||  || — || October 31, 2005 || Catalina || CSS ||  || align=right | 2.0 km || 
|-id=182 bgcolor=#E9E9E9
| 526182 ||  || — || November 25, 2005 || Mount Lemmon || Mount Lemmon Survey ||  || align=right | 1.1 km || 
|-id=183 bgcolor=#E9E9E9
| 526183 ||  || — || November 10, 2005 || Mount Lemmon || Mount Lemmon Survey ||  || align=right | 2.6 km || 
|-id=184 bgcolor=#E9E9E9
| 526184 ||  || — || November 26, 2005 || Mount Lemmon || Mount Lemmon Survey ||  || align=right | 1.1 km || 
|-id=185 bgcolor=#E9E9E9
| 526185 ||  || — || November 12, 2005 || Kitt Peak || Spacewatch ||  || align=right | 1.6 km || 
|-id=186 bgcolor=#E9E9E9
| 526186 ||  || — || November 26, 2005 || Kitt Peak || Spacewatch ||  || align=right | 1.6 km || 
|-id=187 bgcolor=#E9E9E9
| 526187 ||  || — || November 6, 2005 || Mount Lemmon || Mount Lemmon Survey ||  || align=right | 1.6 km || 
|-id=188 bgcolor=#E9E9E9
| 526188 ||  || — || November 28, 2005 || Kitt Peak || Spacewatch ||  || align=right | 1.2 km || 
|-id=189 bgcolor=#E9E9E9
| 526189 ||  || — || November 25, 2005 || Mount Lemmon || Mount Lemmon Survey ||  || align=right data-sort-value="0.57" | 570 m || 
|-id=190 bgcolor=#E9E9E9
| 526190 ||  || — || November 28, 2005 || Catalina || CSS ||  || align=right | 1.3 km || 
|-id=191 bgcolor=#E9E9E9
| 526191 ||  || — || October 24, 2005 || Kitt Peak || Spacewatch ||  || align=right | 1.3 km || 
|-id=192 bgcolor=#E9E9E9
| 526192 ||  || — || November 26, 2005 || Kitt Peak || Spacewatch ||  || align=right | 1.7 km || 
|-id=193 bgcolor=#E9E9E9
| 526193 ||  || — || November 29, 2005 || Socorro || LINEAR ||  || align=right | 1.1 km || 
|-id=194 bgcolor=#fefefe
| 526194 ||  || — || October 29, 2005 || Kitt Peak || Spacewatch ||  || align=right data-sort-value="0.40" | 400 m || 
|-id=195 bgcolor=#E9E9E9
| 526195 ||  || — || November 30, 2005 || Kitt Peak || Spacewatch ||  || align=right | 2.1 km || 
|-id=196 bgcolor=#E9E9E9
| 526196 ||  || — || November 4, 2005 || Mount Lemmon || Mount Lemmon Survey || JUN || align=right data-sort-value="0.89" | 890 m || 
|-id=197 bgcolor=#d6d6d6
| 526197 ||  || — || November 25, 2005 || Mount Lemmon || Mount Lemmon Survey ||  || align=right | 2.7 km || 
|-id=198 bgcolor=#E9E9E9
| 526198 ||  || — || November 25, 2005 || Mount Lemmon || Mount Lemmon Survey ||  || align=right | 1.2 km || 
|-id=199 bgcolor=#E9E9E9
| 526199 ||  || — || November 25, 2005 || Mount Lemmon || Mount Lemmon Survey ||  || align=right | 1.2 km || 
|-id=200 bgcolor=#d6d6d6
| 526200 ||  || — || November 26, 2005 || Mount Lemmon || Mount Lemmon Survey ||  || align=right | 1.9 km || 
|}

526201–526300 

|-bgcolor=#d6d6d6
| 526201 ||  || — || October 1, 2005 || Kitt Peak || Spacewatch ||  || align=right | 3.3 km || 
|-id=202 bgcolor=#fefefe
| 526202 ||  || — || November 22, 2005 || Kitt Peak || Spacewatch || H || align=right data-sort-value="0.63" | 630 m || 
|-id=203 bgcolor=#E9E9E9
| 526203 ||  || — || November 28, 2005 || Socorro || LINEAR ||  || align=right | 1.9 km || 
|-id=204 bgcolor=#E9E9E9
| 526204 ||  || — || November 28, 2005 || Socorro || LINEAR ||  || align=right | 1.8 km || 
|-id=205 bgcolor=#E9E9E9
| 526205 ||  || — || November 30, 2005 || Kitt Peak || Spacewatch || JUN || align=right | 1.0 km || 
|-id=206 bgcolor=#E9E9E9
| 526206 ||  || — || November 2, 2005 || Socorro || LINEAR ||  || align=right | 1.3 km || 
|-id=207 bgcolor=#E9E9E9
| 526207 ||  || — || November 5, 2005 || Catalina || CSS ||  || align=right | 1.5 km || 
|-id=208 bgcolor=#E9E9E9
| 526208 ||  || — || November 25, 2005 || Catalina || CSS ||  || align=right | 1.7 km || 
|-id=209 bgcolor=#E9E9E9
| 526209 ||  || — || October 31, 2005 || Catalina || CSS ||  || align=right | 1.6 km || 
|-id=210 bgcolor=#fefefe
| 526210 ||  || — || October 25, 2005 || Mount Lemmon || Mount Lemmon Survey || H || align=right data-sort-value="0.49" | 490 m || 
|-id=211 bgcolor=#E9E9E9
| 526211 ||  || — || December 1, 2005 || Socorro || LINEAR || JUN || align=right data-sort-value="0.84" | 840 m || 
|-id=212 bgcolor=#E9E9E9
| 526212 ||  || — || November 21, 2005 || Catalina || CSS ||  || align=right | 2.3 km || 
|-id=213 bgcolor=#d6d6d6
| 526213 ||  || — || December 1, 2005 || Mount Lemmon || Mount Lemmon Survey ||  || align=right | 2.3 km || 
|-id=214 bgcolor=#E9E9E9
| 526214 ||  || — || December 1, 2005 || Kitt Peak || Spacewatch ||  || align=right | 1.4 km || 
|-id=215 bgcolor=#E9E9E9
| 526215 ||  || — || December 4, 2005 || Kitt Peak || Spacewatch ||  || align=right | 1.6 km || 
|-id=216 bgcolor=#E9E9E9
| 526216 ||  || — || December 1, 2005 || Socorro || LINEAR ||  || align=right | 2.2 km || 
|-id=217 bgcolor=#E9E9E9
| 526217 ||  || — || December 4, 2005 || Kitt Peak || Spacewatch || NEM || align=right | 1.8 km || 
|-id=218 bgcolor=#E9E9E9
| 526218 ||  || — || December 2, 2005 || Mount Lemmon || Mount Lemmon Survey ||  || align=right data-sort-value="0.73" | 730 m || 
|-id=219 bgcolor=#E9E9E9
| 526219 ||  || — || December 2, 2005 || Kitt Peak || Spacewatch ||  || align=right | 2.0 km || 
|-id=220 bgcolor=#E9E9E9
| 526220 ||  || — || December 2, 2005 || Kitt Peak || Spacewatch ||  || align=right | 1.2 km || 
|-id=221 bgcolor=#E9E9E9
| 526221 ||  || — || December 3, 2005 || Kitt Peak || Spacewatch ||  || align=right | 1.1 km || 
|-id=222 bgcolor=#fefefe
| 526222 ||  || — || December 4, 2005 || Kitt Peak || Spacewatch || H || align=right data-sort-value="0.60" | 600 m || 
|-id=223 bgcolor=#E9E9E9
| 526223 ||  || — || December 6, 2005 || Kitt Peak || Spacewatch ||  || align=right | 1.7 km || 
|-id=224 bgcolor=#E9E9E9
| 526224 ||  || — || December 7, 2005 || Kitt Peak || Spacewatch || EUN || align=right | 1.1 km || 
|-id=225 bgcolor=#E9E9E9
| 526225 ||  || — || November 6, 2005 || Mount Lemmon || Mount Lemmon Survey ||  || align=right data-sort-value="0.78" | 780 m || 
|-id=226 bgcolor=#E9E9E9
| 526226 ||  || — || September 30, 2005 || Mount Lemmon || Mount Lemmon Survey ||  || align=right | 1.2 km || 
|-id=227 bgcolor=#E9E9E9
| 526227 ||  || — || December 22, 2005 || Kitt Peak || Spacewatch ||  || align=right data-sort-value="0.67" | 670 m || 
|-id=228 bgcolor=#E9E9E9
| 526228 ||  || — || December 21, 2005 || Kitt Peak || Spacewatch ||  || align=right | 2.2 km || 
|-id=229 bgcolor=#E9E9E9
| 526229 ||  || — || December 22, 2005 || Kitt Peak || Spacewatch ||  || align=right | 1.3 km || 
|-id=230 bgcolor=#E9E9E9
| 526230 ||  || — || December 22, 2005 || Kitt Peak || Spacewatch ||  || align=right | 1.5 km || 
|-id=231 bgcolor=#E9E9E9
| 526231 ||  || — || December 22, 2005 || Kitt Peak || Spacewatch ||  || align=right | 1.7 km || 
|-id=232 bgcolor=#E9E9E9
| 526232 ||  || — || November 30, 2005 || Mount Lemmon || Mount Lemmon Survey ||  || align=right data-sort-value="0.91" | 910 m || 
|-id=233 bgcolor=#E9E9E9
| 526233 ||  || — || December 2, 2005 || Mount Lemmon || Mount Lemmon Survey ||  || align=right | 1.3 km || 
|-id=234 bgcolor=#E9E9E9
| 526234 ||  || — || December 24, 2005 || Kitt Peak || Spacewatch ||  || align=right | 1.3 km || 
|-id=235 bgcolor=#E9E9E9
| 526235 ||  || — || December 22, 2005 || Kitt Peak || Spacewatch ||  || align=right | 1.8 km || 
|-id=236 bgcolor=#E9E9E9
| 526236 ||  || — || December 24, 2005 || Kitt Peak || Spacewatch ||  || align=right | 2.3 km || 
|-id=237 bgcolor=#E9E9E9
| 526237 ||  || — || December 25, 2005 || Kitt Peak || Spacewatch ||  || align=right | 2.4 km || 
|-id=238 bgcolor=#FFC2E0
| 526238 ||  || — || December 25, 2005 || Catalina || CSS || AMO || align=right data-sort-value="0.45" | 450 m || 
|-id=239 bgcolor=#fefefe
| 526239 ||  || — || December 25, 2005 || Kitt Peak || Spacewatch || H || align=right data-sort-value="0.46" | 460 m || 
|-id=240 bgcolor=#E9E9E9
| 526240 ||  || — || December 26, 2005 || Mount Lemmon || Mount Lemmon Survey ||  || align=right | 1.9 km || 
|-id=241 bgcolor=#E9E9E9
| 526241 ||  || — || October 30, 2005 || Mount Lemmon || Mount Lemmon Survey ||  || align=right | 1.5 km || 
|-id=242 bgcolor=#E9E9E9
| 526242 ||  || — || December 24, 2005 || Kitt Peak || Spacewatch ||  || align=right | 1.6 km || 
|-id=243 bgcolor=#E9E9E9
| 526243 ||  || — || December 24, 2005 || Kitt Peak || Spacewatch ||  || align=right data-sort-value="0.62" | 620 m || 
|-id=244 bgcolor=#E9E9E9
| 526244 ||  || — || December 2, 2005 || Mount Lemmon || Mount Lemmon Survey ||  || align=right | 1.5 km || 
|-id=245 bgcolor=#E9E9E9
| 526245 ||  || — || December 27, 2005 || Kitt Peak || Spacewatch ||  || align=right data-sort-value="0.92" | 920 m || 
|-id=246 bgcolor=#E9E9E9
| 526246 ||  || — || December 24, 2005 || Kitt Peak || Spacewatch ||  || align=right | 1.4 km || 
|-id=247 bgcolor=#fefefe
| 526247 ||  || — || December 24, 2005 || Kitt Peak || Spacewatch || H || align=right data-sort-value="0.66" | 660 m || 
|-id=248 bgcolor=#E9E9E9
| 526248 ||  || — || December 2, 2005 || Mount Lemmon || Mount Lemmon Survey ||  || align=right | 2.1 km || 
|-id=249 bgcolor=#E9E9E9
| 526249 ||  || — || December 25, 2005 || Kitt Peak || Spacewatch || JUN || align=right data-sort-value="0.66" | 660 m || 
|-id=250 bgcolor=#E9E9E9
| 526250 ||  || — || December 25, 2005 || Kitt Peak || Spacewatch ||  || align=right | 2.3 km || 
|-id=251 bgcolor=#E9E9E9
| 526251 ||  || — || December 25, 2005 || Kitt Peak || Spacewatch ||  || align=right | 1.5 km || 
|-id=252 bgcolor=#E9E9E9
| 526252 ||  || — || December 26, 2005 || Kitt Peak || Spacewatch ||  || align=right | 1.4 km || 
|-id=253 bgcolor=#E9E9E9
| 526253 ||  || — || December 26, 2005 || Kitt Peak || Spacewatch ||  || align=right | 1.6 km || 
|-id=254 bgcolor=#fefefe
| 526254 ||  || — || December 26, 2005 || Kitt Peak || Spacewatch ||  || align=right data-sort-value="0.50" | 500 m || 
|-id=255 bgcolor=#FA8072
| 526255 ||  || — || December 30, 2005 || Mount Lemmon || Mount Lemmon Survey ||  || align=right | 1.9 km || 
|-id=256 bgcolor=#fefefe
| 526256 ||  || — || December 5, 2005 || Socorro || LINEAR || H || align=right data-sort-value="0.70" | 700 m || 
|-id=257 bgcolor=#E9E9E9
| 526257 ||  || — || December 26, 2005 || Kitt Peak || Spacewatch ||  || align=right data-sort-value="0.69" | 690 m || 
|-id=258 bgcolor=#E9E9E9
| 526258 ||  || — || December 26, 2005 || Kitt Peak || Spacewatch ||  || align=right data-sort-value="0.99" | 990 m || 
|-id=259 bgcolor=#E9E9E9
| 526259 ||  || — || December 28, 2005 || Mount Lemmon || Mount Lemmon Survey ||  || align=right | 1.4 km || 
|-id=260 bgcolor=#fefefe
| 526260 ||  || — || December 27, 2005 || Kitt Peak || Spacewatch ||  || align=right data-sort-value="0.66" | 660 m || 
|-id=261 bgcolor=#E9E9E9
| 526261 ||  || — || December 27, 2005 || Kitt Peak || Spacewatch ||  || align=right data-sort-value="0.56" | 560 m || 
|-id=262 bgcolor=#d6d6d6
| 526262 ||  || — || December 1, 2005 || Mount Lemmon || Mount Lemmon Survey || 7:4 || align=right | 3.0 km || 
|-id=263 bgcolor=#E9E9E9
| 526263 ||  || — || December 23, 2005 || Catalina || CSS ||  || align=right | 1.6 km || 
|-id=264 bgcolor=#E9E9E9
| 526264 ||  || — || November 12, 2005 || Kitt Peak || Spacewatch || JUN || align=right | 1.1 km || 
|-id=265 bgcolor=#E9E9E9
| 526265 ||  || — || December 28, 2005 || Kitt Peak || Spacewatch ||  || align=right | 1.3 km || 
|-id=266 bgcolor=#E9E9E9
| 526266 ||  || — || December 30, 2005 || Kitt Peak || Spacewatch ||  || align=right | 1.7 km || 
|-id=267 bgcolor=#E9E9E9
| 526267 ||  || — || December 30, 2005 || Kitt Peak || Spacewatch ||  || align=right | 1.6 km || 
|-id=268 bgcolor=#E9E9E9
| 526268 ||  || — || December 24, 2005 || Kitt Peak || Spacewatch ||  || align=right | 1.5 km || 
|-id=269 bgcolor=#E9E9E9
| 526269 ||  || — || December 5, 2005 || Mount Lemmon || Mount Lemmon Survey ||  || align=right | 1.3 km || 
|-id=270 bgcolor=#E9E9E9
| 526270 ||  || — || November 30, 2005 || Mount Lemmon || Mount Lemmon Survey ||  || align=right | 2.4 km || 
|-id=271 bgcolor=#E9E9E9
| 526271 ||  || — || December 26, 2005 || Kitt Peak || Spacewatch ||  || align=right | 2.0 km || 
|-id=272 bgcolor=#E9E9E9
| 526272 ||  || — || November 30, 2005 || Kitt Peak || Spacewatch ||  || align=right | 2.6 km || 
|-id=273 bgcolor=#E9E9E9
| 526273 ||  || — || January 6, 2006 || Catalina || CSS || BAR || align=right | 1.2 km || 
|-id=274 bgcolor=#fefefe
| 526274 ||  || — || January 4, 2006 || Kitt Peak || Spacewatch || H || align=right data-sort-value="0.60" | 600 m || 
|-id=275 bgcolor=#E9E9E9
| 526275 ||  || — || December 25, 2005 || Mount Lemmon || Mount Lemmon Survey ||  || align=right data-sort-value="0.69" | 690 m || 
|-id=276 bgcolor=#E9E9E9
| 526276 ||  || — || December 2, 2005 || Mount Lemmon || Mount Lemmon Survey || GAL || align=right | 1.3 km || 
|-id=277 bgcolor=#E9E9E9
| 526277 ||  || — || January 5, 2006 || Kitt Peak || Spacewatch ||  || align=right | 1.2 km || 
|-id=278 bgcolor=#fefefe
| 526278 ||  || — || January 5, 2006 || Kitt Peak || Spacewatch ||  || align=right data-sort-value="0.63" | 630 m || 
|-id=279 bgcolor=#E9E9E9
| 526279 ||  || — || December 28, 2005 || Kitt Peak || Spacewatch ||  || align=right data-sort-value="0.96" | 960 m || 
|-id=280 bgcolor=#E9E9E9
| 526280 ||  || — || January 8, 2006 || Kitt Peak || Spacewatch ||  || align=right | 1.5 km || 
|-id=281 bgcolor=#E9E9E9
| 526281 ||  || — || December 28, 2005 || Mount Lemmon || Mount Lemmon Survey ||  || align=right | 1.5 km || 
|-id=282 bgcolor=#E9E9E9
| 526282 ||  || — || January 5, 2006 || Mount Lemmon || Mount Lemmon Survey ||  || align=right | 1.2 km || 
|-id=283 bgcolor=#fefefe
| 526283 ||  || — || January 5, 2006 || Mount Lemmon || Mount Lemmon Survey ||  || align=right data-sort-value="0.76" | 760 m || 
|-id=284 bgcolor=#E9E9E9
| 526284 ||  || — || January 5, 2006 || Mount Lemmon || Mount Lemmon Survey ||  || align=right | 1.4 km || 
|-id=285 bgcolor=#E9E9E9
| 526285 ||  || — || December 24, 2005 || Kitt Peak || Spacewatch ||  || align=right | 2.9 km || 
|-id=286 bgcolor=#fefefe
| 526286 ||  || — || January 4, 2006 || Kitt Peak || Spacewatch || H || align=right data-sort-value="0.69" | 690 m || 
|-id=287 bgcolor=#E9E9E9
| 526287 ||  || — || January 7, 2006 || Mount Lemmon || Mount Lemmon Survey ||  || align=right data-sort-value="0.71" | 710 m || 
|-id=288 bgcolor=#E9E9E9
| 526288 ||  || — || January 7, 2006 || Mount Lemmon || Mount Lemmon Survey ||  || align=right | 1.3 km || 
|-id=289 bgcolor=#E9E9E9
| 526289 ||  || — || January 20, 2006 || Kitt Peak || Spacewatch ||  || align=right | 1.2 km || 
|-id=290 bgcolor=#fefefe
| 526290 ||  || — || January 21, 2006 || Mount Lemmon || Mount Lemmon Survey || H || align=right data-sort-value="0.62" | 620 m || 
|-id=291 bgcolor=#E9E9E9
| 526291 ||  || — || August 25, 2004 || Kitt Peak || Spacewatch ||  || align=right | 1.4 km || 
|-id=292 bgcolor=#E9E9E9
| 526292 ||  || — || December 24, 2005 || Kitt Peak || Spacewatch ||  || align=right | 1.8 km || 
|-id=293 bgcolor=#E9E9E9
| 526293 ||  || — || December 25, 2005 || Mount Lemmon || Mount Lemmon Survey ||  || align=right | 1.7 km || 
|-id=294 bgcolor=#E9E9E9
| 526294 ||  || — || January 20, 2006 || Kitt Peak || Spacewatch ||  || align=right | 1.1 km || 
|-id=295 bgcolor=#E9E9E9
| 526295 ||  || — || January 23, 2006 || Kitt Peak || Spacewatch ||  || align=right | 1.1 km || 
|-id=296 bgcolor=#E9E9E9
| 526296 ||  || — || January 25, 2006 || Kitt Peak || Spacewatch ||  || align=right | 1.2 km || 
|-id=297 bgcolor=#E9E9E9
| 526297 ||  || — || January 21, 2006 || Kitt Peak || Spacewatch ||  || align=right | 1.5 km || 
|-id=298 bgcolor=#E9E9E9
| 526298 ||  || — || January 22, 2006 || Mount Lemmon || Mount Lemmon Survey || AEO || align=right data-sort-value="0.87" | 870 m || 
|-id=299 bgcolor=#E9E9E9
| 526299 ||  || — || January 23, 2006 || Kitt Peak || Spacewatch || BRG || align=right | 1.3 km || 
|-id=300 bgcolor=#E9E9E9
| 526300 ||  || — || January 23, 2006 || Kitt Peak || Spacewatch ||  || align=right | 1.3 km || 
|}

526301–526400 

|-bgcolor=#E9E9E9
| 526301 ||  || — || January 23, 2006 || Kitt Peak || Spacewatch ||  || align=right | 2.7 km || 
|-id=302 bgcolor=#E9E9E9
| 526302 ||  || — || January 25, 2006 || Kitt Peak || Spacewatch ||  || align=right | 2.0 km || 
|-id=303 bgcolor=#E9E9E9
| 526303 ||  || — || January 25, 2006 || Kitt Peak || Spacewatch ||  || align=right | 1.2 km || 
|-id=304 bgcolor=#E9E9E9
| 526304 ||  || — || January 25, 2006 || Kitt Peak || Spacewatch ||  || align=right | 1.8 km || 
|-id=305 bgcolor=#E9E9E9
| 526305 ||  || — || January 8, 2006 || Mount Lemmon || Mount Lemmon Survey ||  || align=right | 1.3 km || 
|-id=306 bgcolor=#E9E9E9
| 526306 ||  || — || January 26, 2006 || Kitt Peak || Spacewatch ||  || align=right | 1.1 km || 
|-id=307 bgcolor=#E9E9E9
| 526307 ||  || — || January 27, 2006 || Mount Lemmon || Mount Lemmon Survey ||  || align=right data-sort-value="0.68" | 680 m || 
|-id=308 bgcolor=#E9E9E9
| 526308 ||  || — || January 10, 2006 || Kitt Peak || Spacewatch ||  || align=right | 1.0 km || 
|-id=309 bgcolor=#E9E9E9
| 526309 ||  || — || January 25, 2006 || Kitt Peak || Spacewatch || MRX || align=right data-sort-value="0.86" | 860 m || 
|-id=310 bgcolor=#E9E9E9
| 526310 ||  || — || January 26, 2006 || Kitt Peak || Spacewatch ||  || align=right | 1.4 km || 
|-id=311 bgcolor=#E9E9E9
| 526311 ||  || — || January 5, 2006 || Mount Lemmon || Mount Lemmon Survey ||  || align=right | 1.4 km || 
|-id=312 bgcolor=#E9E9E9
| 526312 ||  || — || January 25, 2006 || Kitt Peak || Spacewatch ||  || align=right | 2.2 km || 
|-id=313 bgcolor=#E9E9E9
| 526313 ||  || — || January 9, 2006 || Kitt Peak || Spacewatch ||  || align=right | 2.0 km || 
|-id=314 bgcolor=#E9E9E9
| 526314 ||  || — || January 25, 2006 || Kitt Peak || Spacewatch || EUN || align=right data-sort-value="0.84" | 840 m || 
|-id=315 bgcolor=#fefefe
| 526315 ||  || — || January 9, 2006 || Mount Lemmon || Mount Lemmon Survey || H || align=right data-sort-value="0.49" | 490 m || 
|-id=316 bgcolor=#C2FFFF
| 526316 ||  || — || January 26, 2006 || Kitt Peak || Spacewatch || L5 || align=right | 8.3 km || 
|-id=317 bgcolor=#E9E9E9
| 526317 ||  || — || January 26, 2006 || Mount Lemmon || Mount Lemmon Survey ||  || align=right | 1.7 km || 
|-id=318 bgcolor=#E9E9E9
| 526318 ||  || — || January 27, 2006 || Kitt Peak || Spacewatch ||  || align=right data-sort-value="0.98" | 980 m || 
|-id=319 bgcolor=#E9E9E9
| 526319 ||  || — || January 28, 2006 || Mount Lemmon || Mount Lemmon Survey || GEF || align=right | 1.0 km || 
|-id=320 bgcolor=#fefefe
| 526320 ||  || — || January 23, 2006 || Kitt Peak || Spacewatch || H || align=right data-sort-value="0.59" | 590 m || 
|-id=321 bgcolor=#E9E9E9
| 526321 ||  || — || January 31, 2006 || Mount Lemmon || Mount Lemmon Survey ||  || align=right | 2.1 km || 
|-id=322 bgcolor=#E9E9E9
| 526322 ||  || — || January 31, 2006 || Kitt Peak || Spacewatch || JUN || align=right data-sort-value="0.88" | 880 m || 
|-id=323 bgcolor=#E9E9E9
| 526323 ||  || — || January 22, 2006 || Catalina || CSS ||  || align=right | 1.4 km || 
|-id=324 bgcolor=#E9E9E9
| 526324 ||  || — || January 27, 2006 || Anderson Mesa || LONEOS ||  || align=right | 1.3 km || 
|-id=325 bgcolor=#E9E9E9
| 526325 ||  || — || January 7, 2006 || Mount Lemmon || Mount Lemmon Survey ||  || align=right | 1.8 km || 
|-id=326 bgcolor=#fefefe
| 526326 ||  || — || January 30, 2006 || Kitt Peak || Spacewatch || H || align=right data-sort-value="0.68" | 680 m || 
|-id=327 bgcolor=#E9E9E9
| 526327 ||  || — || January 23, 2006 || Kitt Peak || Spacewatch ||  || align=right | 1.8 km || 
|-id=328 bgcolor=#E9E9E9
| 526328 ||  || — || January 2, 2006 || Mount Lemmon || Mount Lemmon Survey ||  || align=right | 1.3 km || 
|-id=329 bgcolor=#E9E9E9
| 526329 ||  || — || January 8, 2006 || Mount Lemmon || Mount Lemmon Survey ||  || align=right | 1.4 km || 
|-id=330 bgcolor=#E9E9E9
| 526330 ||  || — || January 22, 2006 || Mount Lemmon || Mount Lemmon Survey ||  || align=right data-sort-value="0.79" | 790 m || 
|-id=331 bgcolor=#fefefe
| 526331 ||  || — || January 22, 2006 || Mount Lemmon || Mount Lemmon Survey ||  || align=right data-sort-value="0.64" | 640 m || 
|-id=332 bgcolor=#E9E9E9
| 526332 ||  || — || January 22, 2006 || Mount Lemmon || Mount Lemmon Survey ||  || align=right | 1.9 km || 
|-id=333 bgcolor=#fefefe
| 526333 ||  || — || January 23, 2006 || Mount Lemmon || Mount Lemmon Survey ||  || align=right data-sort-value="0.57" | 570 m || 
|-id=334 bgcolor=#fefefe
| 526334 ||  || — || January 23, 2006 || Mount Lemmon || Mount Lemmon Survey ||  || align=right data-sort-value="0.75" | 750 m || 
|-id=335 bgcolor=#FA8072
| 526335 ||  || — || January 28, 2006 || Anderson Mesa || LONEOS || H || align=right data-sort-value="0.55" | 550 m || 
|-id=336 bgcolor=#FA8072
| 526336 ||  || — || February 3, 2006 || Socorro || LINEAR ||  || align=right data-sort-value="0.80" | 800 m || 
|-id=337 bgcolor=#E9E9E9
| 526337 ||  || — || January 9, 2006 || Kitt Peak || Spacewatch ||  || align=right data-sort-value="0.96" | 960 m || 
|-id=338 bgcolor=#E9E9E9
| 526338 ||  || — || February 2, 2006 || Kitt Peak || Spacewatch ||  || align=right | 2.0 km || 
|-id=339 bgcolor=#E9E9E9
| 526339 ||  || — || January 25, 2006 || Kitt Peak || Spacewatch ||  || align=right | 1.1 km || 
|-id=340 bgcolor=#fefefe
| 526340 ||  || — || January 22, 2006 || Mount Lemmon || Mount Lemmon Survey ||  || align=right data-sort-value="0.46" | 460 m || 
|-id=341 bgcolor=#fefefe
| 526341 ||  || — || January 22, 2006 || Mount Lemmon || Mount Lemmon Survey ||  || align=right data-sort-value="0.60" | 600 m || 
|-id=342 bgcolor=#E9E9E9
| 526342 ||  || — || February 2, 2006 || Kitt Peak || Spacewatch ||  || align=right | 1.2 km || 
|-id=343 bgcolor=#E9E9E9
| 526343 ||  || — || January 22, 2006 || Mount Lemmon || Mount Lemmon Survey ||  || align=right | 1.5 km || 
|-id=344 bgcolor=#E9E9E9
| 526344 ||  || — || January 22, 2006 || Mount Lemmon || Mount Lemmon Survey ||  || align=right | 1.1 km || 
|-id=345 bgcolor=#E9E9E9
| 526345 ||  || — || January 22, 2006 || Mount Lemmon || Mount Lemmon Survey ||  || align=right | 2.0 km || 
|-id=346 bgcolor=#E9E9E9
| 526346 ||  || — || January 22, 2006 || Mount Lemmon || Mount Lemmon Survey ||  || align=right | 1.1 km || 
|-id=347 bgcolor=#E9E9E9
| 526347 ||  || — || November 30, 2005 || Kitt Peak || Spacewatch ||  || align=right data-sort-value="0.75" | 750 m || 
|-id=348 bgcolor=#E9E9E9
| 526348 ||  || — || December 7, 2005 || Kitt Peak || Spacewatch ||  || align=right | 2.4 km || 
|-id=349 bgcolor=#E9E9E9
| 526349 ||  || — || September 9, 2008 || Mount Lemmon || Mount Lemmon Survey ||  || align=right | 1.3 km || 
|-id=350 bgcolor=#E9E9E9
| 526350 ||  || — || January 8, 2006 || Mount Lemmon || Mount Lemmon Survey ||  || align=right | 1.5 km || 
|-id=351 bgcolor=#fefefe
| 526351 ||  || — || February 20, 2006 || Kitt Peak || Spacewatch || H || align=right data-sort-value="0.59" | 590 m || 
|-id=352 bgcolor=#E9E9E9
| 526352 ||  || — || February 4, 2006 || Kitt Peak || Spacewatch ||  || align=right | 2.0 km || 
|-id=353 bgcolor=#E9E9E9
| 526353 ||  || — || February 20, 2006 || Kitt Peak || Spacewatch ||  || align=right | 1.3 km || 
|-id=354 bgcolor=#fefefe
| 526354 ||  || — || February 7, 2006 || Mount Lemmon || Mount Lemmon Survey ||  || align=right data-sort-value="0.72" | 720 m || 
|-id=355 bgcolor=#E9E9E9
| 526355 ||  || — || January 30, 2006 || Kitt Peak || Spacewatch ||  || align=right data-sort-value="0.93" | 930 m || 
|-id=356 bgcolor=#fefefe
| 526356 ||  || — || February 1, 2006 || Catalina || CSS || PHO || align=right | 1.0 km || 
|-id=357 bgcolor=#E9E9E9
| 526357 ||  || — || February 22, 2006 || Anderson Mesa || LONEOS ||  || align=right | 1.5 km || 
|-id=358 bgcolor=#E9E9E9
| 526358 ||  || — || February 24, 2006 || Mount Lemmon || Mount Lemmon Survey ||  || align=right data-sort-value="0.93" | 930 m || 
|-id=359 bgcolor=#E9E9E9
| 526359 ||  || — || February 24, 2006 || Mount Lemmon || Mount Lemmon Survey ||  || align=right | 1.1 km || 
|-id=360 bgcolor=#E9E9E9
| 526360 ||  || — || February 24, 2006 || Kitt Peak || Spacewatch ||  || align=right | 1.0 km || 
|-id=361 bgcolor=#fefefe
| 526361 ||  || — || February 24, 2006 || Kitt Peak || Spacewatch || H || align=right data-sort-value="0.59" | 590 m || 
|-id=362 bgcolor=#fefefe
| 526362 ||  || — || February 25, 2006 || Kitt Peak || Spacewatch || H || align=right data-sort-value="0.64" | 640 m || 
|-id=363 bgcolor=#E9E9E9
| 526363 ||  || — || February 25, 2006 || Mount Lemmon || Mount Lemmon Survey ||  || align=right | 1.6 km || 
|-id=364 bgcolor=#E9E9E9
| 526364 ||  || — || February 25, 2006 || Kitt Peak || Spacewatch ||  || align=right | 1.1 km || 
|-id=365 bgcolor=#E9E9E9
| 526365 ||  || — || February 27, 2006 || Mount Lemmon || Mount Lemmon Survey ||  || align=right data-sort-value="0.80" | 800 m || 
|-id=366 bgcolor=#fefefe
| 526366 ||  || — || February 27, 2006 || Kitt Peak || Spacewatch ||  || align=right data-sort-value="0.51" | 510 m || 
|-id=367 bgcolor=#E9E9E9
| 526367 ||  || — || February 22, 2006 || Anderson Mesa || LONEOS ||  || align=right | 2.0 km || 
|-id=368 bgcolor=#E9E9E9
| 526368 ||  || — || February 6, 2006 || Kitt Peak || Spacewatch ||  || align=right | 1.3 km || 
|-id=369 bgcolor=#d6d6d6
| 526369 ||  || — || January 31, 2006 || Kitt Peak || Spacewatch ||  || align=right | 1.9 km || 
|-id=370 bgcolor=#E9E9E9
| 526370 ||  || — || February 25, 2006 || Kitt Peak || Spacewatch || EUN || align=right data-sort-value="0.96" | 960 m || 
|-id=371 bgcolor=#E9E9E9
| 526371 ||  || — || February 25, 2006 || Kitt Peak || Spacewatch ||  || align=right | 2.0 km || 
|-id=372 bgcolor=#E9E9E9
| 526372 ||  || — || January 31, 2006 || Kitt Peak || Spacewatch || MIS || align=right | 2.2 km || 
|-id=373 bgcolor=#fefefe
| 526373 ||  || — || February 2, 2006 || Mount Lemmon || Mount Lemmon Survey ||  || align=right data-sort-value="0.63" | 630 m || 
|-id=374 bgcolor=#C2FFFF
| 526374 ||  || — || January 26, 2006 || Mount Lemmon || Mount Lemmon Survey || L5 || align=right | 7.3 km || 
|-id=375 bgcolor=#E9E9E9
| 526375 ||  || — || February 20, 2006 || Kitt Peak || Spacewatch ||  || align=right | 2.3 km || 
|-id=376 bgcolor=#fefefe
| 526376 ||  || — || September 12, 2004 || Kitt Peak || Spacewatch ||  || align=right data-sort-value="0.56" | 560 m || 
|-id=377 bgcolor=#E9E9E9
| 526377 ||  || — || February 25, 2006 || Kitt Peak || Spacewatch ||  || align=right | 1.5 km || 
|-id=378 bgcolor=#E9E9E9
| 526378 ||  || — || February 24, 2006 || Kitt Peak || Spacewatch ||  || align=right | 2.1 km || 
|-id=379 bgcolor=#E9E9E9
| 526379 ||  || — || March 2, 2006 || Kitt Peak || Spacewatch ||  || align=right | 1.7 km || 
|-id=380 bgcolor=#E9E9E9
| 526380 ||  || — || March 2, 2006 || Kitt Peak || Spacewatch ||  || align=right | 2.0 km || 
|-id=381 bgcolor=#E9E9E9
| 526381 ||  || — || March 3, 2006 || Kitt Peak || Spacewatch ||  || align=right | 1.4 km || 
|-id=382 bgcolor=#E9E9E9
| 526382 ||  || — || March 4, 2006 || Catalina || CSS ||  || align=right | 2.6 km || 
|-id=383 bgcolor=#E9E9E9
| 526383 ||  || — || January 7, 2006 || Mount Lemmon || Mount Lemmon Survey ||  || align=right | 1.8 km || 
|-id=384 bgcolor=#E9E9E9
| 526384 ||  || — || March 5, 2006 || Anderson Mesa || LONEOS ||  || align=right | 1.7 km || 
|-id=385 bgcolor=#E9E9E9
| 526385 ||  || — || April 12, 2002 || Socorro || LINEAR ||  || align=right | 2.2 km || 
|-id=386 bgcolor=#E9E9E9
| 526386 ||  || — || March 25, 2006 || Eskridge || Farpoint Obs. ||  || align=right | 1.3 km || 
|-id=387 bgcolor=#E9E9E9
| 526387 ||  || — || March 26, 2006 || Kitt Peak || Spacewatch ||  || align=right | 2.4 km || 
|-id=388 bgcolor=#d6d6d6
| 526388 ||  || — || March 25, 2006 || Mount Lemmon || Mount Lemmon Survey || 3:2 || align=right | 4.6 km || 
|-id=389 bgcolor=#fefefe
| 526389 ||  || — || March 26, 2006 || Mount Lemmon || Mount Lemmon Survey ||  || align=right | 1.0 km || 
|-id=390 bgcolor=#E9E9E9
| 526390 ||  || — || April 2, 2006 || Catalina || CSS ||  || align=right | 1.8 km || 
|-id=391 bgcolor=#E9E9E9
| 526391 ||  || — || April 4, 2006 || Eskridge || Farpoint Obs. || ADE || align=right | 1.5 km || 
|-id=392 bgcolor=#E9E9E9
| 526392 ||  || — || April 4, 2006 || Lulin || Q.-z. Ye ||  || align=right | 1.3 km || 
|-id=393 bgcolor=#E9E9E9
| 526393 ||  || — || April 8, 2006 || Anderson Mesa || LONEOS ||  || align=right | 1.8 km || 
|-id=394 bgcolor=#fefefe
| 526394 ||  || — || April 2, 2006 || Kitt Peak || Spacewatch || H || align=right data-sort-value="0.89" | 890 m || 
|-id=395 bgcolor=#fefefe
| 526395 ||  || — || April 9, 2006 || Mount Lemmon || Mount Lemmon Survey ||  || align=right data-sort-value="0.59" | 590 m || 
|-id=396 bgcolor=#E9E9E9
| 526396 ||  || — || April 19, 2006 || Mount Lemmon || Mount Lemmon Survey ||  || align=right | 1.1 km || 
|-id=397 bgcolor=#fefefe
| 526397 ||  || — || March 24, 2006 || Kitt Peak || Spacewatch || H || align=right data-sort-value="0.71" | 710 m || 
|-id=398 bgcolor=#E9E9E9
| 526398 ||  || — || April 19, 2006 || Mount Lemmon || Mount Lemmon Survey ||  || align=right | 1.8 km || 
|-id=399 bgcolor=#E9E9E9
| 526399 ||  || — || April 21, 2006 || Kitt Peak || Spacewatch ||  || align=right | 1.5 km || 
|-id=400 bgcolor=#d6d6d6
| 526400 ||  || — || April 24, 2006 || Kitt Peak || Spacewatch ||  || align=right | 2.6 km || 
|}

526401–526500 

|-bgcolor=#FA8072
| 526401 ||  || — || April 18, 2006 || Catalina || CSS ||  || align=right data-sort-value="0.75" | 750 m || 
|-id=402 bgcolor=#E9E9E9
| 526402 ||  || — || April 25, 2006 || Kitt Peak || Spacewatch ||  || align=right | 1.1 km || 
|-id=403 bgcolor=#fefefe
| 526403 ||  || — || April 26, 2006 || Kitt Peak || Spacewatch ||  || align=right data-sort-value="0.59" | 590 m || 
|-id=404 bgcolor=#E9E9E9
| 526404 ||  || — || April 30, 2006 || Kitt Peak || Spacewatch ||  || align=right data-sort-value="0.66" | 660 m || 
|-id=405 bgcolor=#E9E9E9
| 526405 ||  || — || April 25, 2006 || Kitt Peak || Spacewatch ||  || align=right | 1.8 km || 
|-id=406 bgcolor=#fefefe
| 526406 ||  || — || April 26, 2006 || Kitt Peak || Spacewatch || H || align=right data-sort-value="0.60" | 600 m || 
|-id=407 bgcolor=#E9E9E9
| 526407 ||  || — || April 7, 2006 || Kitt Peak || Spacewatch ||  || align=right | 1.9 km || 
|-id=408 bgcolor=#E9E9E9
| 526408 ||  || — || April 26, 2006 || Cerro Tololo || M. W. Buie ||  || align=right | 1.1 km || 
|-id=409 bgcolor=#fefefe
| 526409 ||  || — || April 20, 2006 || Kitt Peak || Spacewatch ||  || align=right data-sort-value="0.76" | 760 m || 
|-id=410 bgcolor=#fefefe
| 526410 ||  || — || April 26, 2006 || Kitt Peak || Spacewatch ||  || align=right data-sort-value="0.76" | 760 m || 
|-id=411 bgcolor=#fefefe
| 526411 ||  || — || April 26, 2006 || Kitt Peak || Spacewatch ||  || align=right data-sort-value="0.69" | 690 m || 
|-id=412 bgcolor=#fefefe
| 526412 ||  || — || April 19, 2006 || Mount Lemmon || Mount Lemmon Survey ||  || align=right data-sort-value="0.67" | 670 m || 
|-id=413 bgcolor=#E9E9E9
| 526413 ||  || — || April 24, 2006 || Mount Lemmon || Mount Lemmon Survey ||  || align=right | 1.6 km || 
|-id=414 bgcolor=#fefefe
| 526414 ||  || — || April 8, 2006 || Kitt Peak || Spacewatch ||  || align=right data-sort-value="0.72" | 720 m || 
|-id=415 bgcolor=#E9E9E9
| 526415 ||  || — || May 1, 2006 || Kitt Peak || Spacewatch ||  || align=right | 1.1 km || 
|-id=416 bgcolor=#E9E9E9
| 526416 ||  || — || May 1, 2006 || Kitt Peak || Spacewatch ||  || align=right | 1.3 km || 
|-id=417 bgcolor=#E9E9E9
| 526417 ||  || — || May 2, 2006 || Mount Lemmon || Mount Lemmon Survey ||  || align=right | 1.3 km || 
|-id=418 bgcolor=#d6d6d6
| 526418 ||  || — || April 24, 2006 || Kitt Peak || Spacewatch ||  || align=right | 2.7 km || 
|-id=419 bgcolor=#E9E9E9
| 526419 ||  || — || May 2, 2006 || Kitt Peak || Spacewatch ||  || align=right | 1.5 km || 
|-id=420 bgcolor=#E9E9E9
| 526420 ||  || — || May 4, 2006 || Mount Lemmon || Mount Lemmon Survey ||  || align=right | 1.2 km || 
|-id=421 bgcolor=#d6d6d6
| 526421 ||  || — || April 26, 2006 || Mount Lemmon || Mount Lemmon Survey ||  || align=right | 3.1 km || 
|-id=422 bgcolor=#d6d6d6
| 526422 ||  || — || April 19, 2006 || Kitt Peak || Spacewatch ||  || align=right | 2.4 km || 
|-id=423 bgcolor=#d6d6d6
| 526423 ||  || — || April 9, 2006 || Kitt Peak || Spacewatch ||  || align=right | 2.2 km || 
|-id=424 bgcolor=#E9E9E9
| 526424 ||  || — || February 7, 2006 || Kitt Peak || Spacewatch ||  || align=right | 2.2 km || 
|-id=425 bgcolor=#fefefe
| 526425 ||  || — || May 2, 2006 || Mount Lemmon || Mount Lemmon Survey ||  || align=right data-sort-value="0.55" | 550 m || 
|-id=426 bgcolor=#fefefe
| 526426 ||  || — || May 6, 2006 || Mount Lemmon || Mount Lemmon Survey ||  || align=right data-sort-value="0.76" | 760 m || 
|-id=427 bgcolor=#E9E9E9
| 526427 ||  || — || May 7, 2006 || Mount Lemmon || Mount Lemmon Survey ||  || align=right | 2.3 km || 
|-id=428 bgcolor=#E9E9E9
| 526428 ||  || — || May 20, 2006 || Kitt Peak || Spacewatch ||  || align=right | 1.1 km || 
|-id=429 bgcolor=#E9E9E9
| 526429 ||  || — || May 20, 2006 || Kitt Peak || Spacewatch ||  || align=right | 1.3 km || 
|-id=430 bgcolor=#fefefe
| 526430 ||  || — || May 21, 2006 || Kitt Peak || Spacewatch || H || align=right data-sort-value="0.75" | 750 m || 
|-id=431 bgcolor=#E9E9E9
| 526431 ||  || — || May 21, 2006 || Kitt Peak || Spacewatch ||  || align=right | 1.5 km || 
|-id=432 bgcolor=#E9E9E9
| 526432 ||  || — || May 16, 2006 || Siding Spring || SSS ||  || align=right | 2.1 km || 
|-id=433 bgcolor=#fefefe
| 526433 ||  || — || May 21, 2006 || Mount Lemmon || Mount Lemmon Survey ||  || align=right data-sort-value="0.51" | 510 m || 
|-id=434 bgcolor=#E9E9E9
| 526434 ||  || — || May 21, 2006 || Mount Lemmon || Mount Lemmon Survey ||  || align=right | 1.5 km || 
|-id=435 bgcolor=#d6d6d6
| 526435 ||  || — || May 21, 2006 || Kitt Peak || Spacewatch ||  || align=right | 2.5 km || 
|-id=436 bgcolor=#d6d6d6
| 526436 ||  || — || May 7, 2006 || Mount Lemmon || Mount Lemmon Survey ||  || align=right | 3.4 km || 
|-id=437 bgcolor=#d6d6d6
| 526437 ||  || — || May 22, 2006 || Kitt Peak || Spacewatch ||  || align=right | 2.4 km || 
|-id=438 bgcolor=#E9E9E9
| 526438 ||  || — || May 20, 2006 || Kitt Peak || Spacewatch ||  || align=right | 1.9 km || 
|-id=439 bgcolor=#E9E9E9
| 526439 ||  || — || May 9, 2006 || Mount Lemmon || Mount Lemmon Survey ||  || align=right | 1.8 km || 
|-id=440 bgcolor=#E9E9E9
| 526440 ||  || — || May 23, 2006 || Kitt Peak || Spacewatch || GAL || align=right | 1.3 km || 
|-id=441 bgcolor=#fefefe
| 526441 ||  || — || May 6, 2006 || Mount Lemmon || Mount Lemmon Survey ||  || align=right data-sort-value="0.72" | 720 m || 
|-id=442 bgcolor=#E9E9E9
| 526442 ||  || — || April 30, 2006 || Kitt Peak || Spacewatch ||  || align=right | 1.5 km || 
|-id=443 bgcolor=#E9E9E9
| 526443 ||  || — || January 17, 2005 || Kitt Peak || Spacewatch ||  || align=right | 3.0 km || 
|-id=444 bgcolor=#E9E9E9
| 526444 ||  || — || May 4, 2006 || Siding Spring || SSS ||  || align=right | 1.9 km || 
|-id=445 bgcolor=#d6d6d6
| 526445 ||  || — || May 25, 2006 || Kitt Peak || Spacewatch ||  || align=right | 4.0 km || 
|-id=446 bgcolor=#E9E9E9
| 526446 ||  || — || May 25, 2006 || Mount Lemmon || Mount Lemmon Survey ||  || align=right | 2.3 km || 
|-id=447 bgcolor=#d6d6d6
| 526447 ||  || — || June 18, 2006 || Kitt Peak || Spacewatch ||  || align=right | 4.8 km || 
|-id=448 bgcolor=#d6d6d6
| 526448 ||  || — || July 21, 2006 || Mount Lemmon || Mount Lemmon Survey ||  || align=right | 2.0 km || 
|-id=449 bgcolor=#FFC2E0
| 526449 ||  || — || July 31, 2006 || Siding Spring || SSS || AMO || align=right data-sort-value="0.58" | 580 m || 
|-id=450 bgcolor=#E9E9E9
| 526450 ||  || — || July 21, 2006 || Mount Lemmon || Mount Lemmon Survey ||  || align=right | 1.6 km || 
|-id=451 bgcolor=#E9E9E9
| 526451 ||  || — || July 18, 2006 || Mount Lemmon || Mount Lemmon Survey ||  || align=right | 2.4 km || 
|-id=452 bgcolor=#fefefe
| 526452 ||  || — || August 14, 2006 || Siding Spring || SSS ||  || align=right | 2.3 km || 
|-id=453 bgcolor=#fefefe
| 526453 ||  || — || August 13, 2006 || Palomar || NEAT || NYS || align=right data-sort-value="0.70" | 700 m || 
|-id=454 bgcolor=#fefefe
| 526454 ||  || — || June 19, 2006 || Mount Lemmon || Mount Lemmon Survey ||  || align=right data-sort-value="0.82" | 820 m || 
|-id=455 bgcolor=#d6d6d6
| 526455 ||  || — || August 19, 2006 || Kitt Peak || Spacewatch ||  || align=right | 2.8 km || 
|-id=456 bgcolor=#fefefe
| 526456 ||  || — || January 19, 2004 || Kitt Peak || Spacewatch ||  || align=right data-sort-value="0.91" | 910 m || 
|-id=457 bgcolor=#fefefe
| 526457 ||  || — || August 24, 2006 || San Marcello || Pistoia Mountains Obs. ||  || align=right data-sort-value="0.94" | 940 m || 
|-id=458 bgcolor=#fefefe
| 526458 ||  || — || August 22, 2006 || Palomar || NEAT ||  || align=right | 1.7 km || 
|-id=459 bgcolor=#E9E9E9
| 526459 ||  || — || August 27, 2006 || Kitt Peak || Spacewatch ||  || align=right | 2.1 km || 
|-id=460 bgcolor=#d6d6d6
| 526460 Ceciliakoocen ||  ||  || August 28, 2006 || Lulin || H.-C. Lin, Q.-z. Ye || Tj (2.99) || align=right | 2.6 km || 
|-id=461 bgcolor=#d6d6d6
| 526461 ||  || — || August 16, 2006 || Palomar || NEAT ||  || align=right | 3.1 km || 
|-id=462 bgcolor=#d6d6d6
| 526462 ||  || — || August 29, 2006 || Catalina || CSS ||  || align=right | 3.0 km || 
|-id=463 bgcolor=#fefefe
| 526463 ||  || — || August 29, 2006 || Kitt Peak || Spacewatch ||  || align=right data-sort-value="0.72" | 720 m || 
|-id=464 bgcolor=#E9E9E9
| 526464 ||  || — || August 19, 2006 || Palomar || NEAT ||  || align=right | 1.8 km || 
|-id=465 bgcolor=#fefefe
| 526465 ||  || — || August 18, 2006 || Kitt Peak || Spacewatch || (2076) || align=right data-sort-value="0.74" | 740 m || 
|-id=466 bgcolor=#d6d6d6
| 526466 ||  || — || August 19, 2006 || Kitt Peak || Spacewatch ||  || align=right | 2.6 km || 
|-id=467 bgcolor=#d6d6d6
| 526467 ||  || — || August 19, 2006 || Kitt Peak || Spacewatch ||  || align=right | 2.3 km || 
|-id=468 bgcolor=#fefefe
| 526468 ||  || — || August 21, 2006 || Socorro || LINEAR ||  || align=right data-sort-value="0.82" | 820 m || 
|-id=469 bgcolor=#d6d6d6
| 526469 ||  || — || August 18, 2006 || Palomar || NEAT ||  || align=right | 3.2 km || 
|-id=470 bgcolor=#d6d6d6
| 526470 ||  || — || August 30, 2006 || Anderson Mesa || LONEOS ||  || align=right | 3.5 km || 
|-id=471 bgcolor=#E9E9E9
| 526471 ||  || — || August 28, 2006 || Kitt Peak || Spacewatch ||  || align=right | 1.8 km || 
|-id=472 bgcolor=#d6d6d6
| 526472 ||  || — || August 28, 2006 || Kitt Peak || Spacewatch ||  || align=right | 2.2 km || 
|-id=473 bgcolor=#d6d6d6
| 526473 ||  || — || August 28, 2006 || Kitt Peak || Spacewatch ||  || align=right | 2.1 km || 
|-id=474 bgcolor=#fefefe
| 526474 ||  || — || August 27, 2006 || Kitt Peak || Spacewatch ||  || align=right data-sort-value="0.63" | 630 m || 
|-id=475 bgcolor=#fefefe
| 526475 ||  || — || August 27, 2006 || Kitt Peak || Spacewatch ||  || align=right data-sort-value="0.63" | 630 m || 
|-id=476 bgcolor=#d6d6d6
| 526476 ||  || — || August 19, 2006 || Kitt Peak || Spacewatch ||  || align=right | 2.0 km || 
|-id=477 bgcolor=#d6d6d6
| 526477 ||  || — || August 28, 2006 || Catalina || CSS ||  || align=right | 3.1 km || 
|-id=478 bgcolor=#fefefe
| 526478 ||  || — || September 11, 2006 || Bergisch Gladbach || W. Bickel ||  || align=right data-sort-value="0.54" | 540 m || 
|-id=479 bgcolor=#d6d6d6
| 526479 ||  || — || September 14, 2006 || Kitt Peak || Spacewatch ||  || align=right | 3.4 km || 
|-id=480 bgcolor=#d6d6d6
| 526480 ||  || — || May 25, 2006 || Mount Lemmon || Mount Lemmon Survey ||  || align=right | 2.7 km || 
|-id=481 bgcolor=#d6d6d6
| 526481 ||  || — || August 30, 2006 || Anderson Mesa || LONEOS || Tj (2.98) || align=right | 2.4 km || 
|-id=482 bgcolor=#d6d6d6
| 526482 ||  || — || September 14, 2006 || Kitt Peak || Spacewatch || 3:2 || align=right | 5.3 km || 
|-id=483 bgcolor=#fefefe
| 526483 ||  || — || August 29, 2006 || Catalina || CSS || PHO || align=right data-sort-value="0.94" | 940 m || 
|-id=484 bgcolor=#d6d6d6
| 526484 ||  || — || May 25, 2006 || Mount Lemmon || Mount Lemmon Survey ||  || align=right | 2.7 km || 
|-id=485 bgcolor=#fefefe
| 526485 ||  || — || September 14, 2006 || Kitt Peak || Spacewatch ||  || align=right data-sort-value="0.59" | 590 m || 
|-id=486 bgcolor=#d6d6d6
| 526486 ||  || — || September 15, 2006 || Kitt Peak || Spacewatch ||  || align=right | 1.7 km || 
|-id=487 bgcolor=#d6d6d6
| 526487 ||  || — || September 15, 2006 || Kitt Peak || Spacewatch ||  || align=right | 2.5 km || 
|-id=488 bgcolor=#d6d6d6
| 526488 ||  || — || September 15, 2006 || Kitt Peak || Spacewatch ||  || align=right | 2.0 km || 
|-id=489 bgcolor=#E9E9E9
| 526489 ||  || — || September 15, 2006 || Kitt Peak || Spacewatch ||  || align=right data-sort-value="0.74" | 740 m || 
|-id=490 bgcolor=#E9E9E9
| 526490 ||  || — || September 14, 2006 || Palomar || NEAT ||  || align=right | 3.7 km || 
|-id=491 bgcolor=#d6d6d6
| 526491 ||  || — || September 14, 2006 || Catalina || CSS || Tj (2.97) || align=right | 3.7 km || 
|-id=492 bgcolor=#fefefe
| 526492 Theaket ||  ||  || September 14, 2006 || Mauna Kea || J. Masiero ||  || align=right data-sort-value="0.59" | 590 m || 
|-id=493 bgcolor=#E9E9E9
| 526493 ||  || — || September 15, 2006 || Kitt Peak || Spacewatch || critical || align=right data-sort-value="0.75" | 750 m || 
|-id=494 bgcolor=#d6d6d6
| 526494 ||  || — || September 14, 2006 || Kitt Peak || Spacewatch ||  || align=right | 2.2 km || 
|-id=495 bgcolor=#E9E9E9
| 526495 ||  || — || September 16, 2006 || Catalina || CSS ||  || align=right data-sort-value="0.94" | 940 m || 
|-id=496 bgcolor=#d6d6d6
| 526496 ||  || — || September 16, 2006 || Catalina || CSS ||  || align=right | 4.8 km || 
|-id=497 bgcolor=#E9E9E9
| 526497 ||  || — || September 16, 2006 || Anderson Mesa || LONEOS ||  || align=right | 1.6 km || 
|-id=498 bgcolor=#fefefe
| 526498 ||  || — || September 16, 2006 || Anderson Mesa || LONEOS ||  || align=right | 1.8 km || 
|-id=499 bgcolor=#E9E9E9
| 526499 ||  || — || August 29, 2006 || Kitt Peak || Spacewatch ||  || align=right data-sort-value="0.77" | 770 m || 
|-id=500 bgcolor=#d6d6d6
| 526500 ||  || — || September 18, 2006 || Catalina || CSS ||  || align=right | 3.1 km || 
|}

526501–526600 

|-bgcolor=#fefefe
| 526501 ||  || — || August 21, 2006 || Kitt Peak || Spacewatch ||  || align=right data-sort-value="0.75" | 750 m || 
|-id=502 bgcolor=#fefefe
| 526502 ||  || — || September 19, 2006 || Kitt Peak || Spacewatch ||  || align=right data-sort-value="0.82" | 820 m || 
|-id=503 bgcolor=#d6d6d6
| 526503 ||  || — || September 20, 2006 || Kitt Peak || Spacewatch ||  || align=right | 2.7 km || 
|-id=504 bgcolor=#d6d6d6
| 526504 ||  || — || September 19, 2006 || Kitt Peak || Spacewatch ||  || align=right | 2.7 km || 
|-id=505 bgcolor=#fefefe
| 526505 ||  || — || September 19, 2006 || Kitt Peak || Spacewatch ||  || align=right | 2.2 km || 
|-id=506 bgcolor=#E9E9E9
| 526506 ||  || — || September 19, 2006 || Kitt Peak || Spacewatch ||  || align=right | 1.9 km || 
|-id=507 bgcolor=#d6d6d6
| 526507 ||  || — || September 18, 2006 || Kitt Peak || Spacewatch ||  || align=right | 2.1 km || 
|-id=508 bgcolor=#fefefe
| 526508 ||  || — || September 18, 2006 || Kitt Peak || Spacewatch ||  || align=right data-sort-value="0.57" | 570 m || 
|-id=509 bgcolor=#d6d6d6
| 526509 ||  || — || September 19, 2006 || Kitt Peak || Spacewatch ||  || align=right | 2.6 km || 
|-id=510 bgcolor=#fefefe
| 526510 ||  || — || September 19, 2006 || Kitt Peak || Spacewatch ||  || align=right data-sort-value="0.60" | 600 m || 
|-id=511 bgcolor=#fefefe
| 526511 ||  || — || September 19, 2006 || Kitt Peak || Spacewatch ||  || align=right data-sort-value="0.86" | 860 m || 
|-id=512 bgcolor=#E9E9E9
| 526512 ||  || — || August 28, 2006 || Kitt Peak || Spacewatch || (5) || align=right data-sort-value="0.74" | 740 m || 
|-id=513 bgcolor=#d6d6d6
| 526513 ||  || — || September 20, 2006 || Anderson Mesa || LONEOS ||  || align=right | 2.7 km || 
|-id=514 bgcolor=#d6d6d6
| 526514 ||  || — || September 24, 2006 || Anderson Mesa || LONEOS || Tj (2.99) || align=right | 3.9 km || 
|-id=515 bgcolor=#d6d6d6
| 526515 ||  || — || September 18, 2006 || Anderson Mesa || LONEOS ||  || align=right | 2.9 km || 
|-id=516 bgcolor=#d6d6d6
| 526516 ||  || — || September 14, 2006 || Catalina || CSS || EUP || align=right | 2.6 km || 
|-id=517 bgcolor=#d6d6d6
| 526517 ||  || — || September 14, 2006 || Catalina || CSS ||  || align=right | 2.6 km || 
|-id=518 bgcolor=#E9E9E9
| 526518 ||  || — || September 22, 2006 || Catalina || CSS ||  || align=right data-sort-value="0.82" | 820 m || 
|-id=519 bgcolor=#d6d6d6
| 526519 ||  || — || September 19, 2006 || Kitt Peak || Spacewatch ||  || align=right | 2.2 km || 
|-id=520 bgcolor=#d6d6d6
| 526520 ||  || — || September 19, 2006 || Kitt Peak || Spacewatch ||  || align=right | 2.1 km || 
|-id=521 bgcolor=#fefefe
| 526521 ||  || — || September 19, 2006 || Kitt Peak || Spacewatch ||  || align=right data-sort-value="0.58" | 580 m || 
|-id=522 bgcolor=#d6d6d6
| 526522 ||  || — || September 19, 2006 || Kitt Peak || Spacewatch ||  || align=right | 1.9 km || 
|-id=523 bgcolor=#d6d6d6
| 526523 ||  || — || September 23, 2006 || Kitt Peak || Spacewatch ||  || align=right | 2.8 km || 
|-id=524 bgcolor=#E9E9E9
| 526524 ||  || — || September 23, 2006 || Kitt Peak || Spacewatch || DOR || align=right | 2.0 km || 
|-id=525 bgcolor=#E9E9E9
| 526525 ||  || — || September 18, 2006 || Kitt Peak || Spacewatch ||  || align=right data-sort-value="0.73" | 730 m || 
|-id=526 bgcolor=#fefefe
| 526526 ||  || — || September 25, 2006 || Kitt Peak || Spacewatch ||  || align=right data-sort-value="0.67" | 670 m || 
|-id=527 bgcolor=#fefefe
| 526527 ||  || — || September 25, 2006 || Mount Lemmon || Mount Lemmon Survey ||  || align=right data-sort-value="0.64" | 640 m || 
|-id=528 bgcolor=#fefefe
| 526528 ||  || — || September 25, 2006 || Kitt Peak || Spacewatch ||  || align=right data-sort-value="0.50" | 500 m || 
|-id=529 bgcolor=#d6d6d6
| 526529 ||  || — || September 25, 2006 || Kitt Peak || Spacewatch ||  || align=right | 2.0 km || 
|-id=530 bgcolor=#d6d6d6
| 526530 ||  || — || September 25, 2006 || Mount Lemmon || Mount Lemmon Survey ||  || align=right | 2.7 km || 
|-id=531 bgcolor=#d6d6d6
| 526531 ||  || — || September 19, 2006 || Kitt Peak || Spacewatch ||  || align=right | 2.5 km || 
|-id=532 bgcolor=#d6d6d6
| 526532 ||  || — || February 26, 2014 || Haleakala || Pan-STARRS ||  || align=right | 2.4 km || 
|-id=533 bgcolor=#fefefe
| 526533 ||  || — || September 27, 2006 || Catalina || CSS ||  || align=right data-sort-value="0.72" | 720 m || 
|-id=534 bgcolor=#d6d6d6
| 526534 ||  || — || September 25, 2006 || Mount Lemmon || Mount Lemmon Survey || 7:4 || align=right | 3.4 km || 
|-id=535 bgcolor=#fefefe
| 526535 ||  || — || September 18, 2006 || Kitt Peak || Spacewatch || NYS || align=right data-sort-value="0.60" | 600 m || 
|-id=536 bgcolor=#d6d6d6
| 526536 ||  || — || September 26, 2006 || Mount Lemmon || Mount Lemmon Survey ||  || align=right | 1.9 km || 
|-id=537 bgcolor=#fefefe
| 526537 ||  || — || September 26, 2006 || Kitt Peak || Spacewatch ||  || align=right data-sort-value="0.77" | 770 m || 
|-id=538 bgcolor=#d6d6d6
| 526538 ||  || — || September 26, 2006 || Mount Lemmon || Mount Lemmon Survey ||  || align=right | 1.6 km || 
|-id=539 bgcolor=#fefefe
| 526539 ||  || — || September 26, 2006 || Kitt Peak || Spacewatch ||  || align=right data-sort-value="0.73" | 730 m || 
|-id=540 bgcolor=#fefefe
| 526540 ||  || — || September 26, 2006 || Kitt Peak || Spacewatch ||  || align=right data-sort-value="0.71" | 710 m || 
|-id=541 bgcolor=#fefefe
| 526541 ||  || — || September 26, 2006 || Kitt Peak || Spacewatch ||  || align=right data-sort-value="0.52" | 520 m || 
|-id=542 bgcolor=#d6d6d6
| 526542 ||  || — || September 26, 2006 || Kitt Peak || Spacewatch ||  || align=right | 3.1 km || 
|-id=543 bgcolor=#d6d6d6
| 526543 ||  || — || September 27, 2006 || Mount Lemmon || Mount Lemmon Survey || THM || align=right | 1.5 km || 
|-id=544 bgcolor=#d6d6d6
| 526544 ||  || — || July 21, 2006 || Mount Lemmon || Mount Lemmon Survey ||  || align=right | 2.7 km || 
|-id=545 bgcolor=#fefefe
| 526545 ||  || — || September 17, 2006 || Catalina || CSS || H || align=right data-sort-value="0.55" | 550 m || 
|-id=546 bgcolor=#E9E9E9
| 526546 ||  || — || September 25, 2006 || Mount Lemmon || Mount Lemmon Survey ||  || align=right data-sort-value="0.75" | 750 m || 
|-id=547 bgcolor=#fefefe
| 526547 ||  || — || September 14, 2006 || Kitt Peak || Spacewatch || PHO || align=right data-sort-value="0.90" | 900 m || 
|-id=548 bgcolor=#fefefe
| 526548 ||  || — || September 25, 2006 || Mount Lemmon || Mount Lemmon Survey || MAS || align=right data-sort-value="0.65" | 650 m || 
|-id=549 bgcolor=#E9E9E9
| 526549 ||  || — || September 17, 2006 || Kitt Peak || Spacewatch ||  || align=right data-sort-value="0.59" | 590 m || 
|-id=550 bgcolor=#d6d6d6
| 526550 ||  || — || September 27, 2006 || Kitt Peak || Spacewatch ||  || align=right | 2.2 km || 
|-id=551 bgcolor=#d6d6d6
| 526551 ||  || — || September 27, 2006 || Kitt Peak || Spacewatch ||  || align=right | 2.1 km || 
|-id=552 bgcolor=#d6d6d6
| 526552 ||  || — || September 19, 2006 || Kitt Peak || Spacewatch ||  || align=right | 2.0 km || 
|-id=553 bgcolor=#d6d6d6
| 526553 ||  || — || September 19, 2006 || Kitt Peak || Spacewatch ||  || align=right | 2.7 km || 
|-id=554 bgcolor=#d6d6d6
| 526554 ||  || — || September 28, 2006 || Kitt Peak || Spacewatch ||  || align=right | 3.0 km || 
|-id=555 bgcolor=#d6d6d6
| 526555 ||  || — || September 18, 2006 || Kitt Peak || Spacewatch ||  || align=right | 2.7 km || 
|-id=556 bgcolor=#E9E9E9
| 526556 ||  || — || September 28, 2006 || Mount Lemmon || Mount Lemmon Survey ||  || align=right data-sort-value="0.86" | 860 m || 
|-id=557 bgcolor=#d6d6d6
| 526557 ||  || — || September 28, 2006 || Kitt Peak || Spacewatch ||  || align=right | 2.3 km || 
|-id=558 bgcolor=#E9E9E9
| 526558 ||  || — || September 18, 2006 || Kitt Peak || Spacewatch ||  || align=right data-sort-value="0.59" | 590 m || 
|-id=559 bgcolor=#d6d6d6
| 526559 ||  || — || September 16, 2006 || Catalina || CSS ||  || align=right | 2.8 km || 
|-id=560 bgcolor=#E9E9E9
| 526560 ||  || — || September 28, 2006 || Mount Lemmon || Mount Lemmon Survey ||  || align=right data-sort-value="0.88" | 880 m || 
|-id=561 bgcolor=#d6d6d6
| 526561 ||  || — || September 17, 2006 || Apache Point || A. C. Becker ||  || align=right | 2.4 km || 
|-id=562 bgcolor=#fefefe
| 526562 ||  || — || September 28, 2006 || Apache Point || A. C. Becker ||  || align=right data-sort-value="0.85" | 850 m || 
|-id=563 bgcolor=#d6d6d6
| 526563 ||  || — || September 17, 2006 || Kitt Peak || Spacewatch ||  || align=right | 2.4 km || 
|-id=564 bgcolor=#d6d6d6
| 526564 ||  || — || September 17, 2006 || Catalina || CSS ||  || align=right | 3.2 km || 
|-id=565 bgcolor=#FA8072
| 526565 ||  || — || September 19, 2006 || Kitt Peak || Spacewatch ||  || align=right data-sort-value="0.34" | 340 m || 
|-id=566 bgcolor=#E9E9E9
| 526566 ||  || — || September 30, 2006 || Mount Lemmon || Mount Lemmon Survey ||  || align=right data-sort-value="0.68" | 680 m || 
|-id=567 bgcolor=#E9E9E9
| 526567 ||  || — || September 28, 2006 || Mount Lemmon || Mount Lemmon Survey ||  || align=right data-sort-value="0.75" | 750 m || 
|-id=568 bgcolor=#d6d6d6
| 526568 ||  || — || September 20, 2006 || Kitt Peak || Spacewatch ||  || align=right | 2.8 km || 
|-id=569 bgcolor=#E9E9E9
| 526569 ||  || — || September 30, 2006 || Mount Lemmon || Mount Lemmon Survey ||  || align=right data-sort-value="0.89" | 890 m || 
|-id=570 bgcolor=#d6d6d6
| 526570 ||  || — || September 16, 2006 || Kitt Peak || Spacewatch ||  || align=right | 3.0 km || 
|-id=571 bgcolor=#fefefe
| 526571 ||  || — || September 19, 2006 || Kitt Peak || Spacewatch ||  || align=right data-sort-value="0.61" | 610 m || 
|-id=572 bgcolor=#fefefe
| 526572 ||  || — || September 17, 2006 || Kitt Peak || Spacewatch ||  || align=right data-sort-value="0.84" | 840 m || 
|-id=573 bgcolor=#d6d6d6
| 526573 ||  || — || September 30, 2006 || Mount Lemmon || Mount Lemmon Survey ||  || align=right | 2.1 km || 
|-id=574 bgcolor=#d6d6d6
| 526574 ||  || — || September 17, 2006 || Catalina || CSS ||  || align=right | 3.3 km || 
|-id=575 bgcolor=#d6d6d6
| 526575 ||  || — || August 21, 2006 || Kitt Peak || Spacewatch ||  || align=right | 2.4 km || 
|-id=576 bgcolor=#d6d6d6
| 526576 ||  || — || October 15, 2001 || Kitt Peak || Spacewatch ||  || align=right | 2.9 km || 
|-id=577 bgcolor=#d6d6d6
| 526577 ||  || — || September 17, 2006 || Catalina || CSS ||  || align=right | 5.6 km || 
|-id=578 bgcolor=#fefefe
| 526578 ||  || — || September 25, 2006 || Mount Lemmon || Mount Lemmon Survey ||  || align=right data-sort-value="0.55" | 550 m || 
|-id=579 bgcolor=#fefefe
| 526579 ||  || — || September 26, 2006 || Mount Lemmon || Mount Lemmon Survey ||  || align=right data-sort-value="0.82" | 820 m || 
|-id=580 bgcolor=#E9E9E9
| 526580 ||  || — || September 26, 2006 || Mount Lemmon || Mount Lemmon Survey ||  || align=right data-sort-value="0.85" | 850 m || 
|-id=581 bgcolor=#d6d6d6
| 526581 ||  || — || September 28, 2006 || Mount Lemmon || Mount Lemmon Survey ||  || align=right | 1.8 km || 
|-id=582 bgcolor=#fefefe
| 526582 ||  || — || September 28, 2006 || Mount Lemmon || Mount Lemmon Survey ||  || align=right data-sort-value="0.69" | 690 m || 
|-id=583 bgcolor=#fefefe
| 526583 ||  || — || September 28, 2006 || Mount Lemmon || Mount Lemmon Survey ||  || align=right data-sort-value="0.82" | 820 m || 
|-id=584 bgcolor=#d6d6d6
| 526584 ||  || — || September 30, 2006 || Mount Lemmon || Mount Lemmon Survey ||  || align=right | 2.4 km || 
|-id=585 bgcolor=#fefefe
| 526585 ||  || — || September 30, 2006 || Mount Lemmon || Mount Lemmon Survey ||  || align=right data-sort-value="0.51" | 510 m || 
|-id=586 bgcolor=#d6d6d6
| 526586 ||  || — || September 24, 2006 || Anderson Mesa || LONEOS ||  || align=right | 2.8 km || 
|-id=587 bgcolor=#FFC2E0
| 526587 ||  || — || October 1, 2006 || Siding Spring || SSS || AMOPHA || align=right data-sort-value="0.35" | 350 m || 
|-id=588 bgcolor=#d6d6d6
| 526588 ||  || — || October 2, 2006 || Mount Lemmon || Mount Lemmon Survey ||  || align=right | 2.5 km || 
|-id=589 bgcolor=#fefefe
| 526589 ||  || — || October 2, 2006 || Mount Lemmon || Mount Lemmon Survey || NYS || align=right data-sort-value="0.52" | 520 m || 
|-id=590 bgcolor=#fefefe
| 526590 ||  || — || October 11, 2006 || Kitt Peak || Spacewatch ||  || align=right data-sort-value="0.93" | 930 m || 
|-id=591 bgcolor=#fefefe
| 526591 ||  || — || October 10, 2006 || Palomar || NEAT ||  || align=right data-sort-value="0.92" | 920 m || 
|-id=592 bgcolor=#d6d6d6
| 526592 ||  || — || September 26, 2006 || Kitt Peak || Spacewatch ||  || align=right | 2.7 km || 
|-id=593 bgcolor=#fefefe
| 526593 ||  || — || October 11, 2006 || Kitt Peak || Spacewatch ||  || align=right data-sort-value="0.86" | 860 m || 
|-id=594 bgcolor=#fefefe
| 526594 ||  || — || October 2, 2006 || Mount Lemmon || Mount Lemmon Survey ||  || align=right data-sort-value="0.66" | 660 m || 
|-id=595 bgcolor=#d6d6d6
| 526595 ||  || — || October 12, 2006 || Kitt Peak || Spacewatch ||  || align=right | 2.4 km || 
|-id=596 bgcolor=#E9E9E9
| 526596 ||  || — || October 4, 2006 || Mount Lemmon || Mount Lemmon Survey ||  || align=right data-sort-value="0.73" | 730 m || 
|-id=597 bgcolor=#d6d6d6
| 526597 ||  || — || October 12, 2006 || Kitt Peak || Spacewatch || EUP || align=right | 3.1 km || 
|-id=598 bgcolor=#E9E9E9
| 526598 ||  || — || September 30, 2006 || Mount Lemmon || Mount Lemmon Survey ||  || align=right data-sort-value="0.62" | 620 m || 
|-id=599 bgcolor=#fefefe
| 526599 ||  || — || October 12, 2006 || Kitt Peak || Spacewatch ||  || align=right data-sort-value="0.62" | 620 m || 
|-id=600 bgcolor=#d6d6d6
| 526600 ||  || — || September 26, 2006 || Mount Lemmon || Mount Lemmon Survey ||  || align=right | 3.7 km || 
|}

526601–526700 

|-bgcolor=#E9E9E9
| 526601 ||  || — || October 12, 2006 || Kitt Peak || Spacewatch ||  || align=right data-sort-value="0.73" | 730 m || 
|-id=602 bgcolor=#fefefe
| 526602 ||  || — || October 12, 2006 || Kitt Peak || Spacewatch ||  || align=right data-sort-value="0.86" | 860 m || 
|-id=603 bgcolor=#E9E9E9
| 526603 ||  || — || October 13, 2006 || Kitt Peak || Spacewatch ||  || align=right data-sort-value="0.78" | 780 m || 
|-id=604 bgcolor=#d6d6d6
| 526604 ||  || — || October 13, 2006 || Kitt Peak || Spacewatch ||  || align=right | 2.3 km || 
|-id=605 bgcolor=#E9E9E9
| 526605 ||  || — || October 13, 2006 || Kitt Peak || Spacewatch ||  || align=right | 1.0 km || 
|-id=606 bgcolor=#d6d6d6
| 526606 ||  || — || October 2, 2006 || Mount Lemmon || Mount Lemmon Survey ||  || align=right | 2.4 km || 
|-id=607 bgcolor=#fefefe
| 526607 ||  || — || October 13, 2006 || Kitt Peak || Spacewatch ||  || align=right data-sort-value="0.74" | 740 m || 
|-id=608 bgcolor=#d6d6d6
| 526608 ||  || — || October 2, 2006 || Mount Lemmon || Mount Lemmon Survey ||  || align=right | 2.5 km || 
|-id=609 bgcolor=#E9E9E9
| 526609 ||  || — || October 13, 2006 || Kitt Peak || Spacewatch ||  || align=right data-sort-value="0.75" | 750 m || 
|-id=610 bgcolor=#E9E9E9
| 526610 ||  || — || September 28, 2006 || Catalina || CSS ||  || align=right | 1.1 km || 
|-id=611 bgcolor=#d6d6d6
| 526611 ||  || — || September 18, 2006 || Kitt Peak || Spacewatch ||  || align=right | 1.9 km || 
|-id=612 bgcolor=#E9E9E9
| 526612 ||  || — || October 15, 2006 || Kitt Peak || Spacewatch ||  || align=right data-sort-value="0.71" | 710 m || 
|-id=613 bgcolor=#d6d6d6
| 526613 ||  || — || September 18, 2006 || Kitt Peak || Spacewatch ||  || align=right | 2.0 km || 
|-id=614 bgcolor=#E9E9E9
| 526614 ||  || — || October 2, 2006 || Mount Lemmon || Mount Lemmon Survey ||  || align=right data-sort-value="0.65" | 650 m || 
|-id=615 bgcolor=#d6d6d6
| 526615 ||  || — || September 28, 2006 || Mount Lemmon || Mount Lemmon Survey ||  || align=right | 2.7 km || 
|-id=616 bgcolor=#fefefe
| 526616 ||  || — || October 15, 2006 || Kitt Peak || Spacewatch ||  || align=right data-sort-value="0.88" | 880 m || 
|-id=617 bgcolor=#d6d6d6
| 526617 ||  || — || October 2, 2006 || Mount Lemmon || Mount Lemmon Survey || Tj (2.92) || align=right | 4.2 km || 
|-id=618 bgcolor=#E9E9E9
| 526618 ||  || — || September 30, 2006 || Mount Lemmon || Mount Lemmon Survey ||  || align=right data-sort-value="0.73" | 730 m || 
|-id=619 bgcolor=#d6d6d6
| 526619 ||  || — || October 15, 2006 || Kitt Peak || Spacewatch ||  || align=right | 2.2 km || 
|-id=620 bgcolor=#d6d6d6
| 526620 ||  || — || October 13, 2006 || Kitt Peak || Spacewatch ||  || align=right | 2.1 km || 
|-id=621 bgcolor=#E9E9E9
| 526621 ||  || — || October 11, 2006 || Kitt Peak || Spacewatch ||  || align=right data-sort-value="0.67" | 670 m || 
|-id=622 bgcolor=#d6d6d6
| 526622 ||  || — || October 2, 2006 || Mount Lemmon || Mount Lemmon Survey ||  || align=right | 2.1 km || 
|-id=623 bgcolor=#d6d6d6
| 526623 ||  || — || October 2, 2006 || Catalina || CSS ||  || align=right | 2.5 km || 
|-id=624 bgcolor=#d6d6d6
| 526624 ||  || — || October 2, 2006 || Mount Lemmon || Mount Lemmon Survey ||  || align=right | 2.1 km || 
|-id=625 bgcolor=#fefefe
| 526625 ||  || — || December 28, 2003 || Kitt Peak || Spacewatch ||  || align=right data-sort-value="0.87" | 870 m || 
|-id=626 bgcolor=#d6d6d6
| 526626 ||  || — || October 4, 2006 || Mount Lemmon || Mount Lemmon Survey ||  || align=right | 3.4 km || 
|-id=627 bgcolor=#d6d6d6
| 526627 ||  || — || October 4, 2006 || Mount Lemmon || Mount Lemmon Survey ||  || align=right | 2.6 km || 
|-id=628 bgcolor=#E9E9E9
| 526628 ||  || — || October 4, 2006 || Mount Lemmon || Mount Lemmon Survey ||  || align=right | 1.0 km || 
|-id=629 bgcolor=#E9E9E9
| 526629 ||  || — || October 17, 2006 || Mount Lemmon || Mount Lemmon Survey ||  || align=right data-sort-value="0.75" | 750 m || 
|-id=630 bgcolor=#E9E9E9
| 526630 ||  || — || September 30, 2006 || Mount Lemmon || Mount Lemmon Survey ||  || align=right data-sort-value="0.71" | 710 m || 
|-id=631 bgcolor=#fefefe
| 526631 ||  || — || October 16, 2006 || Kitt Peak || Spacewatch || NYS || align=right data-sort-value="0.56" | 560 m || 
|-id=632 bgcolor=#d6d6d6
| 526632 ||  || — || September 25, 2006 || Kitt Peak || Spacewatch ||  || align=right | 1.9 km || 
|-id=633 bgcolor=#d6d6d6
| 526633 ||  || — || September 30, 2006 || Mount Lemmon || Mount Lemmon Survey ||  || align=right | 2.1 km || 
|-id=634 bgcolor=#d6d6d6
| 526634 ||  || — || September 27, 2006 || Mount Lemmon || Mount Lemmon Survey || EOS || align=right | 1.8 km || 
|-id=635 bgcolor=#E9E9E9
| 526635 ||  || — || October 16, 2006 || Kitt Peak || Spacewatch ||  || align=right data-sort-value="0.76" | 760 m || 
|-id=636 bgcolor=#d6d6d6
| 526636 ||  || — || August 21, 2006 || Kitt Peak || Spacewatch ||  || align=right | 3.2 km || 
|-id=637 bgcolor=#E9E9E9
| 526637 ||  || — || September 25, 2006 || Kitt Peak || Spacewatch ||  || align=right data-sort-value="0.71" | 710 m || 
|-id=638 bgcolor=#d6d6d6
| 526638 ||  || — || October 17, 2006 || Kitt Peak || Spacewatch ||  || align=right | 2.0 km || 
|-id=639 bgcolor=#fefefe
| 526639 ||  || — || September 26, 2006 || Mount Lemmon || Mount Lemmon Survey ||  || align=right data-sort-value="0.66" | 660 m || 
|-id=640 bgcolor=#E9E9E9
| 526640 ||  || — || October 4, 2006 || Mount Lemmon || Mount Lemmon Survey ||  || align=right data-sort-value="0.91" | 910 m || 
|-id=641 bgcolor=#d6d6d6
| 526641 ||  || — || September 30, 2006 || Mount Lemmon || Mount Lemmon Survey ||  || align=right | 2.3 km || 
|-id=642 bgcolor=#E9E9E9
| 526642 ||  || — || October 16, 2006 || Kitt Peak || Spacewatch ||  || align=right data-sort-value="0.86" | 860 m || 
|-id=643 bgcolor=#fefefe
| 526643 ||  || — || October 17, 2006 || Kitt Peak || Spacewatch ||  || align=right data-sort-value="0.67" | 670 m || 
|-id=644 bgcolor=#d6d6d6
| 526644 ||  || — || September 26, 2006 || Kitt Peak || Spacewatch ||  || align=right | 1.8 km || 
|-id=645 bgcolor=#E9E9E9
| 526645 ||  || — || October 17, 2006 || Kitt Peak || Spacewatch ||  || align=right data-sort-value="0.78" | 780 m || 
|-id=646 bgcolor=#E9E9E9
| 526646 ||  || — || October 17, 2006 || Mount Lemmon || Mount Lemmon Survey ||  || align=right data-sort-value="0.81" | 810 m || 
|-id=647 bgcolor=#d6d6d6
| 526647 ||  || — || October 2, 2006 || Mount Lemmon || Mount Lemmon Survey || 7:4 || align=right | 3.7 km || 
|-id=648 bgcolor=#d6d6d6
| 526648 ||  || — || October 17, 2006 || Kitt Peak || Spacewatch || 3:2 || align=right | 4.7 km || 
|-id=649 bgcolor=#d6d6d6
| 526649 ||  || — || October 18, 2006 || Kitt Peak || Spacewatch ||  || align=right | 2.5 km || 
|-id=650 bgcolor=#E9E9E9
| 526650 ||  || — || September 30, 2006 || Mount Lemmon || Mount Lemmon Survey ||  || align=right data-sort-value="0.71" | 710 m || 
|-id=651 bgcolor=#fefefe
| 526651 ||  || — || October 18, 2006 || Kitt Peak || Spacewatch ||  || align=right data-sort-value="0.77" | 770 m || 
|-id=652 bgcolor=#fefefe
| 526652 ||  || — || September 30, 2006 || Mount Lemmon || Mount Lemmon Survey || NYS || align=right data-sort-value="0.64" | 640 m || 
|-id=653 bgcolor=#d6d6d6
| 526653 ||  || — || August 21, 2006 || Kitt Peak || Spacewatch ||  || align=right | 3.2 km || 
|-id=654 bgcolor=#E9E9E9
| 526654 ||  || — || October 19, 2006 || Kitt Peak || Spacewatch ||  || align=right | 1.8 km || 
|-id=655 bgcolor=#d6d6d6
| 526655 ||  || — || September 18, 2006 || Kitt Peak || Spacewatch ||  || align=right | 2.8 km || 
|-id=656 bgcolor=#E9E9E9
| 526656 ||  || — || October 19, 2006 || Kitt Peak || Spacewatch ||  || align=right data-sort-value="0.67" | 670 m || 
|-id=657 bgcolor=#fefefe
| 526657 ||  || — || October 19, 2006 || Kitt Peak || Spacewatch ||  || align=right data-sort-value="0.61" | 610 m || 
|-id=658 bgcolor=#d6d6d6
| 526658 ||  || — || September 27, 2006 || Mount Lemmon || Mount Lemmon Survey ||  || align=right | 2.2 km || 
|-id=659 bgcolor=#d6d6d6
| 526659 ||  || — || August 27, 2006 || Kitt Peak || Spacewatch ||  || align=right | 2.3 km || 
|-id=660 bgcolor=#E9E9E9
| 526660 ||  || — || September 27, 2006 || Kitt Peak || Spacewatch ||  || align=right data-sort-value="0.49" | 490 m || 
|-id=661 bgcolor=#fefefe
| 526661 ||  || — || October 21, 2006 || Mount Lemmon || Mount Lemmon Survey ||  || align=right data-sort-value="0.62" | 620 m || 
|-id=662 bgcolor=#d6d6d6
| 526662 ||  || — || October 21, 2006 || Mount Lemmon || Mount Lemmon Survey ||  || align=right | 2.3 km || 
|-id=663 bgcolor=#E9E9E9
| 526663 ||  || — || September 17, 2006 || Catalina || CSS ||  || align=right data-sort-value="0.86" | 860 m || 
|-id=664 bgcolor=#d6d6d6
| 526664 ||  || — || September 26, 2006 || Mount Lemmon || Mount Lemmon Survey ||  || align=right | 2.5 km || 
|-id=665 bgcolor=#d6d6d6
| 526665 ||  || — || September 26, 2006 || Mount Lemmon || Mount Lemmon Survey ||  || align=right | 2.5 km || 
|-id=666 bgcolor=#E9E9E9
| 526666 ||  || — || October 21, 2006 || Kitt Peak || Spacewatch ||  || align=right data-sort-value="0.52" | 520 m || 
|-id=667 bgcolor=#d6d6d6
| 526667 ||  || — || September 28, 2006 || Kitt Peak || Spacewatch ||  || align=right | 2.4 km || 
|-id=668 bgcolor=#fefefe
| 526668 ||  || — || September 30, 2006 || Mount Lemmon || Mount Lemmon Survey ||  || align=right data-sort-value="0.73" | 730 m || 
|-id=669 bgcolor=#E9E9E9
| 526669 ||  || — || October 23, 2006 || Kitt Peak || Spacewatch ||  || align=right data-sort-value="0.82" | 820 m || 
|-id=670 bgcolor=#FFC2E0
| 526670 ||  || — || October 31, 2006 || Socorro || LINEAR || APOPHA || align=right data-sort-value="0.25" | 250 m || 
|-id=671 bgcolor=#d6d6d6
| 526671 ||  || — || August 28, 2006 || Catalina || CSS ||  || align=right | 3.1 km || 
|-id=672 bgcolor=#fefefe
| 526672 ||  || — || October 2, 2006 || Mount Lemmon || Mount Lemmon Survey ||  || align=right data-sort-value="0.62" | 620 m || 
|-id=673 bgcolor=#d6d6d6
| 526673 ||  || — || October 28, 2006 || Mount Lemmon || Mount Lemmon Survey ||  || align=right | 2.2 km || 
|-id=674 bgcolor=#E9E9E9
| 526674 ||  || — || October 19, 2006 || Mount Lemmon || Mount Lemmon Survey ||  || align=right data-sort-value="0.57" | 570 m || 
|-id=675 bgcolor=#d6d6d6
| 526675 ||  || — || October 20, 2006 || Kitt Peak || Spacewatch ||  || align=right | 2.8 km || 
|-id=676 bgcolor=#d6d6d6
| 526676 ||  || — || October 2, 2006 || Mount Lemmon || Mount Lemmon Survey ||  || align=right | 3.3 km || 
|-id=677 bgcolor=#d6d6d6
| 526677 ||  || — || October 2, 2006 || Mount Lemmon || Mount Lemmon Survey || HYG || align=right | 2.0 km || 
|-id=678 bgcolor=#d6d6d6
| 526678 ||  || — || August 27, 2006 || Kitt Peak || Spacewatch || KOR || align=right | 1.1 km || 
|-id=679 bgcolor=#d6d6d6
| 526679 ||  || — || August 18, 2006 || Kitt Peak || Spacewatch ||  || align=right | 2.2 km || 
|-id=680 bgcolor=#E9E9E9
| 526680 ||  || — || October 21, 2006 || Kitt Peak || Spacewatch ||  || align=right data-sort-value="0.47" | 470 m || 
|-id=681 bgcolor=#d6d6d6
| 526681 ||  || — || October 29, 2006 || Mount Lemmon || Mount Lemmon Survey ||  || align=right | 3.0 km || 
|-id=682 bgcolor=#d6d6d6
| 526682 ||  || — || August 28, 2005 || Kitt Peak || Spacewatch || 3:2 || align=right | 3.4 km || 
|-id=683 bgcolor=#d6d6d6
| 526683 ||  || — || October 21, 2006 || Mount Lemmon || Mount Lemmon Survey ||  || align=right | 2.9 km || 
|-id=684 bgcolor=#d6d6d6
| 526684 ||  || — || September 19, 2006 || Catalina || CSS ||  || align=right | 3.5 km || 
|-id=685 bgcolor=#d6d6d6
| 526685 ||  || — || October 22, 2006 || Mount Lemmon || Mount Lemmon Survey ||  || align=right | 2.3 km || 
|-id=686 bgcolor=#E9E9E9
| 526686 ||  || — || October 22, 2006 || Mount Lemmon || Mount Lemmon Survey ||  || align=right data-sort-value="0.89" | 890 m || 
|-id=687 bgcolor=#fefefe
| 526687 ||  || — || October 23, 2006 || Mount Lemmon || Mount Lemmon Survey ||  || align=right data-sort-value="0.79" | 790 m || 
|-id=688 bgcolor=#E9E9E9
| 526688 ||  || — || October 23, 2006 || Mount Lemmon || Mount Lemmon Survey ||  || align=right | 1.8 km || 
|-id=689 bgcolor=#d6d6d6
| 526689 ||  || — || October 27, 2006 || Catalina || CSS ||  || align=right | 2.4 km || 
|-id=690 bgcolor=#E9E9E9
| 526690 ||  || — || October 27, 2006 || Mount Lemmon || Mount Lemmon Survey ||  || align=right data-sort-value="0.54" | 540 m || 
|-id=691 bgcolor=#E9E9E9
| 526691 ||  || — || October 30, 2006 || Catalina || CSS ||  || align=right | 1.5 km || 
|-id=692 bgcolor=#E9E9E9
| 526692 ||  || — || October 17, 2006 || Kitt Peak || Spacewatch ||  || align=right data-sort-value="0.75" | 750 m || 
|-id=693 bgcolor=#d6d6d6
| 526693 ||  || — || September 27, 2006 || Mount Lemmon || Mount Lemmon Survey || EOS || align=right | 1.8 km || 
|-id=694 bgcolor=#d6d6d6
| 526694 ||  || — || October 21, 2006 || Kitt Peak || Spacewatch ||  || align=right | 1.8 km || 
|-id=695 bgcolor=#fefefe
| 526695 ||  || — || October 13, 2006 || Kitt Peak || Spacewatch ||  || align=right data-sort-value="0.67" | 670 m || 
|-id=696 bgcolor=#d6d6d6
| 526696 ||  || — || November 9, 2006 || Kitt Peak || Spacewatch ||  || align=right | 2.2 km || 
|-id=697 bgcolor=#E9E9E9
| 526697 ||  || — || October 20, 2006 || Kitt Peak || Spacewatch ||  || align=right data-sort-value="0.65" | 650 m || 
|-id=698 bgcolor=#E9E9E9
| 526698 ||  || — || October 20, 2006 || Mount Lemmon || Mount Lemmon Survey ||  || align=right data-sort-value="0.85" | 850 m || 
|-id=699 bgcolor=#E9E9E9
| 526699 ||  || — || November 10, 2006 || Kitt Peak || Spacewatch || BRG || align=right | 1.1 km || 
|-id=700 bgcolor=#d6d6d6
| 526700 ||  || — || September 28, 2006 || Mount Lemmon || Mount Lemmon Survey || 7:4 || align=right | 2.1 km || 
|}

526701–526800 

|-bgcolor=#fefefe
| 526701 ||  || — || October 28, 2006 || Mount Lemmon || Mount Lemmon Survey ||  || align=right data-sort-value="0.66" | 660 m || 
|-id=702 bgcolor=#fefefe
| 526702 ||  || — || November 9, 2006 || Kitt Peak || Spacewatch || NYS || align=right data-sort-value="0.49" | 490 m || 
|-id=703 bgcolor=#E9E9E9
| 526703 ||  || — || October 21, 2006 || Kitt Peak || Spacewatch ||  || align=right data-sort-value="0.71" | 710 m || 
|-id=704 bgcolor=#E9E9E9
| 526704 ||  || — || November 9, 2006 || Kitt Peak || Spacewatch ||  || align=right data-sort-value="0.59" | 590 m || 
|-id=705 bgcolor=#d6d6d6
| 526705 ||  || — || October 28, 2006 || Mount Lemmon || Mount Lemmon Survey ||  || align=right | 2.5 km || 
|-id=706 bgcolor=#E9E9E9
| 526706 ||  || — || November 11, 2006 || Kitt Peak || Spacewatch ||  || align=right data-sort-value="0.77" | 770 m || 
|-id=707 bgcolor=#E9E9E9
| 526707 ||  || — || September 28, 2006 || Mount Lemmon || Mount Lemmon Survey ||  || align=right data-sort-value="0.62" | 620 m || 
|-id=708 bgcolor=#FA8072
| 526708 ||  || — || November 12, 2006 || Mount Lemmon || Mount Lemmon Survey ||  || align=right data-sort-value="0.82" | 820 m || 
|-id=709 bgcolor=#E9E9E9
| 526709 ||  || — || September 28, 2006 || Mount Lemmon || Mount Lemmon Survey ||  || align=right | 1.3 km || 
|-id=710 bgcolor=#d6d6d6
| 526710 ||  || — || November 14, 2006 || Kitt Peak || Spacewatch ||  || align=right | 3.6 km || 
|-id=711 bgcolor=#E9E9E9
| 526711 ||  || — || November 15, 2006 || Kitt Peak || Spacewatch ||  || align=right | 1.4 km || 
|-id=712 bgcolor=#E9E9E9
| 526712 ||  || — || October 20, 2006 || Mount Lemmon || Mount Lemmon Survey ||  || align=right data-sort-value="0.86" | 860 m || 
|-id=713 bgcolor=#d6d6d6
| 526713 ||  || — || November 15, 2006 || Catalina || CSS ||  || align=right | 3.4 km || 
|-id=714 bgcolor=#fefefe
| 526714 ||  || — || November 11, 2006 || Kitt Peak || Spacewatch || MAS || align=right data-sort-value="0.57" | 570 m || 
|-id=715 bgcolor=#d6d6d6
| 526715 ||  || — || November 1, 2006 || Kitt Peak || Spacewatch || KOR || align=right | 1.0 km || 
|-id=716 bgcolor=#d6d6d6
| 526716 ||  || — || November 1, 2006 || Kitt Peak || Spacewatch ||  || align=right | 2.4 km || 
|-id=717 bgcolor=#d6d6d6
| 526717 ||  || — || November 1, 2006 || Mount Lemmon || Mount Lemmon Survey ||  || align=right | 2.6 km || 
|-id=718 bgcolor=#d6d6d6
| 526718 ||  || — || November 2, 2006 || Mount Lemmon || Mount Lemmon Survey ||  || align=right | 2.9 km || 
|-id=719 bgcolor=#fefefe
| 526719 ||  || — || November 13, 2006 || Catalina || CSS ||  || align=right data-sort-value="0.84" | 840 m || 
|-id=720 bgcolor=#d6d6d6
| 526720 ||  || — || November 13, 2006 || Catalina || CSS ||  || align=right | 4.2 km || 
|-id=721 bgcolor=#fefefe
| 526721 ||  || — || November 15, 2006 || Catalina || CSS ||  || align=right data-sort-value="0.74" | 740 m || 
|-id=722 bgcolor=#d6d6d6
| 526722 ||  || — || November 12, 2006 || Mount Lemmon || Mount Lemmon Survey ||  || align=right | 2.6 km || 
|-id=723 bgcolor=#d6d6d6
| 526723 ||  || — || November 16, 2006 || Kitt Peak || Spacewatch ||  || align=right | 2.5 km || 
|-id=724 bgcolor=#E9E9E9
| 526724 ||  || — || November 19, 2006 || Kitt Peak || Spacewatch ||  || align=right data-sort-value="0.97" | 970 m || 
|-id=725 bgcolor=#d6d6d6
| 526725 ||  || — || October 23, 2006 || Mount Lemmon || Mount Lemmon Survey ||  || align=right | 2.5 km || 
|-id=726 bgcolor=#E9E9E9
| 526726 ||  || — || October 23, 2006 || Mount Lemmon || Mount Lemmon Survey ||  || align=right data-sort-value="0.67" | 670 m || 
|-id=727 bgcolor=#E9E9E9
| 526727 ||  || — || November 16, 2006 || Kitt Peak || Spacewatch ||  || align=right data-sort-value="0.69" | 690 m || 
|-id=728 bgcolor=#d6d6d6
| 526728 ||  || — || November 16, 2006 || Mount Lemmon || Mount Lemmon Survey ||  || align=right | 2.2 km || 
|-id=729 bgcolor=#E9E9E9
| 526729 ||  || — || November 16, 2006 || Kitt Peak || Spacewatch ||  || align=right data-sort-value="0.71" | 710 m || 
|-id=730 bgcolor=#E9E9E9
| 526730 ||  || — || November 16, 2006 || Kitt Peak || Spacewatch ||  || align=right | 1.1 km || 
|-id=731 bgcolor=#d6d6d6
| 526731 ||  || — || November 16, 2006 || Kitt Peak || Spacewatch ||  || align=right | 2.0 km || 
|-id=732 bgcolor=#E9E9E9
| 526732 ||  || — || November 11, 2006 || Kitt Peak || Spacewatch ||  || align=right | 1.2 km || 
|-id=733 bgcolor=#E9E9E9
| 526733 ||  || — || November 17, 2006 || Kitt Peak || Spacewatch ||  || align=right data-sort-value="0.79" | 790 m || 
|-id=734 bgcolor=#E9E9E9
| 526734 ||  || — || October 3, 2006 || Mount Lemmon || Mount Lemmon Survey ||  || align=right data-sort-value="0.82" | 820 m || 
|-id=735 bgcolor=#fefefe
| 526735 ||  || — || November 10, 2006 || Kitt Peak || Spacewatch ||  || align=right data-sort-value="0.65" | 650 m || 
|-id=736 bgcolor=#fefefe
| 526736 ||  || — || November 18, 2006 || Kitt Peak || Spacewatch ||  || align=right data-sort-value="0.70" | 700 m || 
|-id=737 bgcolor=#d6d6d6
| 526737 ||  || — || November 18, 2006 || Mount Lemmon || Mount Lemmon Survey ||  || align=right | 3.1 km || 
|-id=738 bgcolor=#E9E9E9
| 526738 ||  || — || November 19, 2006 || Kitt Peak || Spacewatch ||  || align=right data-sort-value="0.67" | 670 m || 
|-id=739 bgcolor=#d6d6d6
| 526739 ||  || — || November 19, 2006 || Kitt Peak || Spacewatch ||  || align=right | 2.3 km || 
|-id=740 bgcolor=#E9E9E9
| 526740 ||  || — || November 19, 2006 || Kitt Peak || Spacewatch ||  || align=right data-sort-value="0.81" | 810 m || 
|-id=741 bgcolor=#E9E9E9
| 526741 ||  || — || November 21, 2006 || Mount Lemmon || Mount Lemmon Survey ||  || align=right data-sort-value="0.78" | 780 m || 
|-id=742 bgcolor=#FFC2E0
| 526742 ||  || — || November 25, 2006 || Mount Lemmon || Mount Lemmon Survey || ATE || align=right data-sort-value="0.31" | 310 m || 
|-id=743 bgcolor=#fefefe
| 526743 ||  || — || November 19, 2006 || Kitt Peak || Spacewatch ||  || align=right data-sort-value="0.73" | 730 m || 
|-id=744 bgcolor=#d6d6d6
| 526744 ||  || — || November 19, 2006 || Kitt Peak || Spacewatch || THM || align=right | 1.7 km || 
|-id=745 bgcolor=#E9E9E9
| 526745 ||  || — || November 16, 2006 || Kitt Peak || Spacewatch ||  || align=right data-sort-value="0.71" | 710 m || 
|-id=746 bgcolor=#E9E9E9
| 526746 ||  || — || November 16, 2006 || Kitt Peak || Spacewatch ||  || align=right data-sort-value="0.57" | 570 m || 
|-id=747 bgcolor=#E9E9E9
| 526747 ||  || — || November 11, 2006 || Mount Lemmon || Mount Lemmon Survey ||  || align=right data-sort-value="0.62" | 620 m || 
|-id=748 bgcolor=#E9E9E9
| 526748 ||  || — || October 3, 2006 || Mount Lemmon || Mount Lemmon Survey ||  || align=right data-sort-value="0.59" | 590 m || 
|-id=749 bgcolor=#E9E9E9
| 526749 ||  || — || November 22, 2006 || Mount Lemmon || Mount Lemmon Survey ||  || align=right data-sort-value="0.86" | 860 m || 
|-id=750 bgcolor=#E9E9E9
| 526750 ||  || — || November 15, 2006 || Kitt Peak || Spacewatch ||  || align=right data-sort-value="0.94" | 940 m || 
|-id=751 bgcolor=#d6d6d6
| 526751 ||  || — || October 19, 2006 || Mount Lemmon || Mount Lemmon Survey ||  || align=right | 2.1 km || 
|-id=752 bgcolor=#E9E9E9
| 526752 ||  || — || November 11, 2006 || Mount Lemmon || Mount Lemmon Survey ||  || align=right data-sort-value="0.52" | 520 m || 
|-id=753 bgcolor=#fefefe
| 526753 ||  || — || November 11, 2006 || Kitt Peak || Spacewatch ||  || align=right data-sort-value="0.65" | 650 m || 
|-id=754 bgcolor=#d6d6d6
| 526754 ||  || — || October 31, 2006 || Mount Lemmon || Mount Lemmon Survey || 7:4 || align=right | 3.0 km || 
|-id=755 bgcolor=#E9E9E9
| 526755 ||  || — || November 26, 2006 || Kitt Peak || Spacewatch ||  || align=right data-sort-value="0.82" | 820 m || 
|-id=756 bgcolor=#E9E9E9
| 526756 ||  || — || November 18, 2006 || Mount Lemmon || Mount Lemmon Survey ||  || align=right data-sort-value="0.82" | 820 m || 
|-id=757 bgcolor=#d6d6d6
| 526757 ||  || — || November 16, 2006 || Kitt Peak || Spacewatch ||  || align=right | 3.1 km || 
|-id=758 bgcolor=#E9E9E9
| 526758 ||  || — || November 17, 2006 || Kitt Peak || Spacewatch ||  || align=right data-sort-value="0.73" | 730 m || 
|-id=759 bgcolor=#d6d6d6
| 526759 ||  || — || November 16, 2006 || Mount Lemmon || Mount Lemmon Survey ||  || align=right | 3.1 km || 
|-id=760 bgcolor=#d6d6d6
| 526760 ||  || — || November 21, 2006 || Mount Lemmon || Mount Lemmon Survey ||  || align=right | 3.6 km || 
|-id=761 bgcolor=#E9E9E9
| 526761 ||  || — || November 23, 2006 || Mount Lemmon || Mount Lemmon Survey ||  || align=right data-sort-value="0.86" | 860 m || 
|-id=762 bgcolor=#fefefe
| 526762 ||  || — || November 17, 2006 || Mount Lemmon || Mount Lemmon Survey ||  || align=right data-sort-value="0.88" | 880 m || 
|-id=763 bgcolor=#d6d6d6
| 526763 ||  || — || November 16, 2006 || Mount Lemmon || Mount Lemmon Survey ||  || align=right | 2.6 km || 
|-id=764 bgcolor=#d6d6d6
| 526764 ||  || — || November 17, 2006 || Mount Lemmon || Mount Lemmon Survey ||  || align=right | 2.2 km || 
|-id=765 bgcolor=#d6d6d6
| 526765 ||  || — || November 17, 2006 || Catalina || CSS || Tj (2.97) || align=right | 3.4 km || 
|-id=766 bgcolor=#d6d6d6
| 526766 ||  || — || November 17, 2006 || Mount Lemmon || Mount Lemmon Survey ||  || align=right | 2.7 km || 
|-id=767 bgcolor=#d6d6d6
| 526767 ||  || — || November 17, 2006 || Mount Lemmon || Mount Lemmon Survey ||  || align=right | 2.8 km || 
|-id=768 bgcolor=#E9E9E9
| 526768 ||  || — || November 17, 2006 || Mount Lemmon || Mount Lemmon Survey ||  || align=right data-sort-value="0.97" | 970 m || 
|-id=769 bgcolor=#d6d6d6
| 526769 ||  || — || November 18, 2006 || Mount Lemmon || Mount Lemmon Survey ||  || align=right | 2.4 km || 
|-id=770 bgcolor=#d6d6d6
| 526770 ||  || — || October 16, 2006 || Catalina || CSS ||  || align=right | 2.4 km || 
|-id=771 bgcolor=#d6d6d6
| 526771 ||  || — || November 21, 2006 || Mount Lemmon || Mount Lemmon Survey ||  || align=right | 2.1 km || 
|-id=772 bgcolor=#fefefe
| 526772 ||  || — || November 22, 2006 || Catalina || CSS ||  || align=right | 1.0 km || 
|-id=773 bgcolor=#fefefe
| 526773 ||  || — || November 23, 2006 || Mount Lemmon || Mount Lemmon Survey ||  || align=right data-sort-value="0.85" | 850 m || 
|-id=774 bgcolor=#FA8072
| 526774 ||  || — || December 12, 2006 || Socorro || LINEAR ||  || align=right data-sort-value="0.56" | 560 m || 
|-id=775 bgcolor=#d6d6d6
| 526775 ||  || — || December 10, 2006 || Kitt Peak || Spacewatch || TIR || align=right | 2.6 km || 
|-id=776 bgcolor=#fefefe
| 526776 ||  || — || December 12, 2006 || Catalina || CSS ||  || align=right data-sort-value="0.98" | 980 m || 
|-id=777 bgcolor=#E9E9E9
| 526777 ||  || — || November 28, 2006 || Kitt Peak || Spacewatch ||  || align=right data-sort-value="0.87" | 870 m || 
|-id=778 bgcolor=#E9E9E9
| 526778 ||  || — || November 27, 2006 || Kitt Peak || Spacewatch ||  || align=right data-sort-value="0.71" | 710 m || 
|-id=779 bgcolor=#E9E9E9
| 526779 ||  || — || December 13, 2006 || Catalina || CSS ||  || align=right | 1.6 km || 
|-id=780 bgcolor=#E9E9E9
| 526780 ||  || — || November 27, 2006 || Mount Lemmon || Mount Lemmon Survey ||  || align=right data-sort-value="0.94" | 940 m || 
|-id=781 bgcolor=#E9E9E9
| 526781 ||  || — || November 15, 2006 || Mount Lemmon || Mount Lemmon Survey ||  || align=right data-sort-value="0.97" | 970 m || 
|-id=782 bgcolor=#E9E9E9
| 526782 ||  || — || December 14, 2006 || Palomar || NEAT ||  || align=right | 1.3 km || 
|-id=783 bgcolor=#E9E9E9
| 526783 ||  || — || December 15, 2006 || Kitt Peak || Spacewatch ||  || align=right data-sort-value="0.96" | 960 m || 
|-id=784 bgcolor=#E9E9E9
| 526784 ||  || — || December 15, 2006 || Kitt Peak || Spacewatch ||  || align=right data-sort-value="0.68" | 680 m || 
|-id=785 bgcolor=#fefefe
| 526785 ||  || — || December 1, 2006 || Mount Lemmon || Mount Lemmon Survey ||  || align=right data-sort-value="0.85" | 850 m || 
|-id=786 bgcolor=#d6d6d6
| 526786 ||  || — || December 13, 2006 || Mount Lemmon || Mount Lemmon Survey ||  || align=right | 2.9 km || 
|-id=787 bgcolor=#d6d6d6
| 526787 ||  || — || December 15, 2006 || Mount Lemmon || Mount Lemmon Survey ||  || align=right | 3.0 km || 
|-id=788 bgcolor=#FA8072
| 526788 ||  || — || December 16, 2006 || Mount Lemmon || Mount Lemmon Survey ||  || align=right | 1.1 km || 
|-id=789 bgcolor=#E9E9E9
| 526789 ||  || — || December 16, 2006 || Mount Lemmon || Mount Lemmon Survey ||  || align=right data-sort-value="0.99" | 990 m || 
|-id=790 bgcolor=#E9E9E9
| 526790 ||  || — || October 3, 2006 || Mount Lemmon || Mount Lemmon Survey ||  || align=right data-sort-value="0.91" | 910 m || 
|-id=791 bgcolor=#E9E9E9
| 526791 ||  || — || December 13, 2006 || Mount Lemmon || Mount Lemmon Survey ||  || align=right data-sort-value="0.86" | 860 m || 
|-id=792 bgcolor=#E9E9E9
| 526792 ||  || — || December 13, 2006 || Kitt Peak || Spacewatch ||  || align=right data-sort-value="0.75" | 750 m || 
|-id=793 bgcolor=#E9E9E9
| 526793 ||  || — || December 21, 2006 || Kitt Peak || Spacewatch ||  || align=right data-sort-value="0.71" | 710 m || 
|-id=794 bgcolor=#E9E9E9
| 526794 ||  || — || November 27, 2006 || Mount Lemmon || Mount Lemmon Survey ||  || align=right data-sort-value="0.87" | 870 m || 
|-id=795 bgcolor=#d6d6d6
| 526795 ||  || — || December 13, 2006 || Kitt Peak || Spacewatch ||  || align=right | 2.1 km || 
|-id=796 bgcolor=#d6d6d6
| 526796 ||  || — || December 29, 2006 || Mount Lemmon || Mount Lemmon Survey ||  || align=right | 3.3 km || 
|-id=797 bgcolor=#E9E9E9
| 526797 ||  || — || November 27, 2006 || Mount Lemmon || Mount Lemmon Survey ||  || align=right data-sort-value="0.71" | 710 m || 
|-id=798 bgcolor=#FFC2E0
| 526798 ||  || — || January 13, 2007 || Socorro || LINEAR || ATEcritical || align=right data-sort-value="0.12" | 120 m || 
|-id=799 bgcolor=#E9E9E9
| 526799 ||  || — || October 23, 2006 || Mount Lemmon || Mount Lemmon Survey ||  || align=right data-sort-value="0.88" | 880 m || 
|-id=800 bgcolor=#E9E9E9
| 526800 ||  || — || December 24, 2006 || Kitt Peak || Spacewatch ||  || align=right | 1.1 km || 
|}

526801–526900 

|-bgcolor=#E9E9E9
| 526801 ||  || — || January 10, 2007 || Mount Lemmon || Mount Lemmon Survey ||  || align=right data-sort-value="0.65" | 650 m || 
|-id=802 bgcolor=#FA8072
| 526802 ||  || — || January 16, 2007 || Catalina || CSS ||  || align=right | 2.0 km || 
|-id=803 bgcolor=#E9E9E9
| 526803 ||  || — || December 23, 2006 || Catalina || CSS ||  || align=right | 1.2 km || 
|-id=804 bgcolor=#E9E9E9
| 526804 ||  || — || November 27, 2006 || Mount Lemmon || Mount Lemmon Survey ||  || align=right data-sort-value="0.91" | 910 m || 
|-id=805 bgcolor=#d6d6d6
| 526805 ||  || — || December 21, 2006 || Mount Lemmon || Mount Lemmon Survey ||  || align=right | 3.0 km || 
|-id=806 bgcolor=#E9E9E9
| 526806 ||  || — || December 26, 2006 || Kitt Peak || Spacewatch ||  || align=right data-sort-value="0.57" | 570 m || 
|-id=807 bgcolor=#E9E9E9
| 526807 ||  || — || November 27, 2006 || Mount Lemmon || Mount Lemmon Survey ||  || align=right | 1.3 km || 
|-id=808 bgcolor=#d6d6d6
| 526808 ||  || — || January 24, 2007 || Mount Lemmon || Mount Lemmon Survey || THM || align=right | 1.8 km || 
|-id=809 bgcolor=#FA8072
| 526809 ||  || — || January 24, 2007 || Kitt Peak || Spacewatch || H || align=right data-sort-value="0.52" | 520 m || 
|-id=810 bgcolor=#d6d6d6
| 526810 ||  || — || December 21, 2006 || Kitt Peak || Spacewatch ||  || align=right | 3.2 km || 
|-id=811 bgcolor=#E9E9E9
| 526811 ||  || — || January 24, 2007 || Mount Lemmon || Mount Lemmon Survey ||  || align=right data-sort-value="0.81" | 810 m || 
|-id=812 bgcolor=#E9E9E9
| 526812 ||  || — || December 27, 2006 || Mount Lemmon || Mount Lemmon Survey ||  || align=right data-sort-value="0.71" | 710 m || 
|-id=813 bgcolor=#E9E9E9
| 526813 ||  || — || December 21, 2006 || Mount Lemmon || Mount Lemmon Survey ||  || align=right | 1.6 km || 
|-id=814 bgcolor=#E9E9E9
| 526814 ||  || — || November 22, 2006 || Mount Lemmon || Mount Lemmon Survey ||  || align=right data-sort-value="0.92" | 920 m || 
|-id=815 bgcolor=#d6d6d6
| 526815 ||  || — || January 10, 2007 || Kitt Peak || Spacewatch ||  || align=right | 2.1 km || 
|-id=816 bgcolor=#E9E9E9
| 526816 ||  || — || December 21, 2006 || Mount Lemmon || Mount Lemmon Survey ||  || align=right | 1.6 km || 
|-id=817 bgcolor=#E9E9E9
| 526817 ||  || — || January 17, 2007 || Palomar || NEAT ||  || align=right data-sort-value="0.76" | 760 m || 
|-id=818 bgcolor=#d6d6d6
| 526818 ||  || — || January 28, 2007 || Mount Lemmon || Mount Lemmon Survey ||  || align=right | 3.1 km || 
|-id=819 bgcolor=#E9E9E9
| 526819 ||  || — || January 17, 2007 || Kitt Peak || Spacewatch ||  || align=right | 1.7 km || 
|-id=820 bgcolor=#d6d6d6
| 526820 ||  || — || January 27, 2007 || Mount Lemmon || Mount Lemmon Survey ||  || align=right | 2.7 km || 
|-id=821 bgcolor=#fefefe
| 526821 ||  || — || January 27, 2007 || Mount Lemmon || Mount Lemmon Survey ||  || align=right data-sort-value="0.72" | 720 m || 
|-id=822 bgcolor=#E9E9E9
| 526822 ||  || — || January 27, 2007 || Kitt Peak || Spacewatch || EUN || align=right | 1.00 km || 
|-id=823 bgcolor=#E9E9E9
| 526823 ||  || — || January 9, 2007 || Kitt Peak || Spacewatch ||  || align=right | 1.2 km || 
|-id=824 bgcolor=#E9E9E9
| 526824 ||  || — || February 7, 2007 || Mount Lemmon || Mount Lemmon Survey ||  || align=right | 1.5 km || 
|-id=825 bgcolor=#FFC2E0
| 526825 ||  || — || February 8, 2007 || Palomar || NEAT || APO || align=right data-sort-value="0.56" | 560 m || 
|-id=826 bgcolor=#FFC2E0
| 526826 ||  || — || February 13, 2007 || Catalina || CSS || ATEcritical || align=right data-sort-value="0.20" | 200 m || 
|-id=827 bgcolor=#E9E9E9
| 526827 ||  || — || January 9, 2007 || Kitt Peak || Spacewatch ||  || align=right data-sort-value="0.82" | 820 m || 
|-id=828 bgcolor=#fefefe
| 526828 ||  || — || January 27, 2007 || Mount Lemmon || Mount Lemmon Survey ||  || align=right data-sort-value="0.58" | 580 m || 
|-id=829 bgcolor=#d6d6d6
| 526829 ||  || — || February 6, 2007 || Mount Lemmon || Mount Lemmon Survey ||  || align=right | 2.3 km || 
|-id=830 bgcolor=#d6d6d6
| 526830 ||  || — || February 7, 2007 || Mount Lemmon || Mount Lemmon Survey || Tj (2.99) || align=right | 3.4 km || 
|-id=831 bgcolor=#d6d6d6
| 526831 ||  || — || November 28, 2006 || Mount Lemmon || Mount Lemmon Survey || Tj (2.96) || align=right | 3.6 km || 
|-id=832 bgcolor=#d6d6d6
| 526832 ||  || — || February 13, 2007 || Mount Lemmon || Mount Lemmon Survey ||  || align=right | 2.5 km || 
|-id=833 bgcolor=#d6d6d6
| 526833 ||  || — || February 6, 2007 || Mount Lemmon || Mount Lemmon Survey ||  || align=right | 3.4 km || 
|-id=834 bgcolor=#d6d6d6
| 526834 ||  || — || February 8, 2007 || Mount Lemmon || Mount Lemmon Survey ||  || align=right | 3.5 km || 
|-id=835 bgcolor=#E9E9E9
| 526835 ||  || — || February 13, 2007 || Mount Lemmon || Mount Lemmon Survey ||  || align=right | 1.0 km || 
|-id=836 bgcolor=#d6d6d6
| 526836 ||  || — || February 8, 2007 || Kitt Peak || Spacewatch ||  || align=right | 3.1 km || 
|-id=837 bgcolor=#E9E9E9
| 526837 ||  || — || January 28, 2007 || Mount Lemmon || Mount Lemmon Survey ||  || align=right data-sort-value="0.58" | 580 m || 
|-id=838 bgcolor=#E9E9E9
| 526838 ||  || — || January 27, 2007 || Mount Lemmon || Mount Lemmon Survey ||  || align=right | 1.4 km || 
|-id=839 bgcolor=#E9E9E9
| 526839 ||  || — || January 27, 2007 || Mount Lemmon || Mount Lemmon Survey ||  || align=right | 1.5 km || 
|-id=840 bgcolor=#E9E9E9
| 526840 ||  || — || February 17, 2007 || Kitt Peak || Spacewatch ||  || align=right data-sort-value="0.71" | 710 m || 
|-id=841 bgcolor=#E9E9E9
| 526841 ||  || — || February 21, 2007 || Kitt Peak || Spacewatch ||  || align=right | 1.9 km || 
|-id=842 bgcolor=#E9E9E9
| 526842 ||  || — || August 29, 2005 || Kitt Peak || Spacewatch ||  || align=right | 1.2 km || 
|-id=843 bgcolor=#E9E9E9
| 526843 ||  || — || February 21, 2007 || Kitt Peak || Spacewatch || MIS || align=right | 1.8 km || 
|-id=844 bgcolor=#d6d6d6
| 526844 ||  || — || February 21, 2007 || Kitt Peak || Spacewatch || THM || align=right | 1.8 km || 
|-id=845 bgcolor=#E9E9E9
| 526845 ||  || — || February 21, 2007 || Kitt Peak || Spacewatch ||  || align=right data-sort-value="0.63" | 630 m || 
|-id=846 bgcolor=#E9E9E9
| 526846 ||  || — || December 21, 2006 || Mount Lemmon || Mount Lemmon Survey ||  || align=right data-sort-value="0.73" | 730 m || 
|-id=847 bgcolor=#E9E9E9
| 526847 ||  || — || January 28, 2007 || Catalina || CSS ||  || align=right | 2.9 km || 
|-id=848 bgcolor=#d6d6d6
| 526848 ||  || — || January 28, 2007 || Mount Lemmon || Mount Lemmon Survey ||  || align=right | 2.5 km || 
|-id=849 bgcolor=#E9E9E9
| 526849 ||  || — || February 18, 2007 || Socorro || LINEAR ||  || align=right | 1.3 km || 
|-id=850 bgcolor=#E9E9E9
| 526850 ||  || — || February 23, 2007 || Kitt Peak || Spacewatch ||  || align=right data-sort-value="0.87" | 870 m || 
|-id=851 bgcolor=#E9E9E9
| 526851 ||  || — || February 21, 2007 || Kitt Peak || Spacewatch ||  || align=right | 2.0 km || 
|-id=852 bgcolor=#d6d6d6
| 526852 ||  || — || February 21, 2007 || Mount Lemmon || Mount Lemmon Survey ||  || align=right | 2.9 km || 
|-id=853 bgcolor=#C2FFFF
| 526853 ||  || — || February 21, 2007 || Mount Lemmon || Mount Lemmon Survey || L5 || align=right | 9.9 km || 
|-id=854 bgcolor=#d6d6d6
| 526854 ||  || — || February 23, 2007 || Mount Lemmon || Mount Lemmon Survey ||  || align=right | 2.9 km || 
|-id=855 bgcolor=#E9E9E9
| 526855 ||  || — || February 25, 2007 || Mount Lemmon || Mount Lemmon Survey ||  || align=right data-sort-value="0.89" | 890 m || 
|-id=856 bgcolor=#fefefe
| 526856 ||  || — || January 28, 2007 || Kitt Peak || Spacewatch ||  || align=right data-sort-value="0.59" | 590 m || 
|-id=857 bgcolor=#d6d6d6
| 526857 ||  || — || March 9, 2007 || Mount Lemmon || Mount Lemmon Survey ||  || align=right | 2.5 km || 
|-id=858 bgcolor=#E9E9E9
| 526858 ||  || — || February 21, 2007 || Mount Lemmon || Mount Lemmon Survey ||  || align=right data-sort-value="0.69" | 690 m || 
|-id=859 bgcolor=#E9E9E9
| 526859 ||  || — || March 9, 2007 || Mount Lemmon || Mount Lemmon Survey ||  || align=right | 3.3 km || 
|-id=860 bgcolor=#E9E9E9
| 526860 ||  || — || March 9, 2007 || Mount Lemmon || Mount Lemmon Survey ||  || align=right | 1.9 km || 
|-id=861 bgcolor=#fefefe
| 526861 ||  || — || February 21, 2007 || Kitt Peak || Spacewatch ||  || align=right data-sort-value="0.57" | 570 m || 
|-id=862 bgcolor=#E9E9E9
| 526862 ||  || — || March 13, 2007 || Kitt Peak || Spacewatch ||  || align=right data-sort-value="0.94" | 940 m || 
|-id=863 bgcolor=#E9E9E9
| 526863 ||  || — || March 11, 2007 || Kitt Peak || Spacewatch ||  || align=right | 1.3 km || 
|-id=864 bgcolor=#E9E9E9
| 526864 ||  || — || February 23, 2007 || Mount Lemmon || Mount Lemmon Survey || ADE || align=right | 1.5 km || 
|-id=865 bgcolor=#E9E9E9
| 526865 ||  || — || March 9, 2007 || Mount Lemmon || Mount Lemmon Survey || JUN || align=right | 1.0 km || 
|-id=866 bgcolor=#E9E9E9
| 526866 ||  || — || February 17, 2007 || Kitt Peak || Spacewatch ||  || align=right | 1.2 km || 
|-id=867 bgcolor=#E9E9E9
| 526867 ||  || — || February 26, 2007 || Mount Lemmon || Mount Lemmon Survey ||  || align=right data-sort-value="0.78" | 780 m || 
|-id=868 bgcolor=#fefefe
| 526868 ||  || — || March 12, 2007 || Mount Lemmon || Mount Lemmon Survey ||  || align=right data-sort-value="0.68" | 680 m || 
|-id=869 bgcolor=#E9E9E9
| 526869 ||  || — || March 14, 2007 || Kitt Peak || Spacewatch ||  || align=right | 2.0 km || 
|-id=870 bgcolor=#E9E9E9
| 526870 ||  || — || January 28, 2007 || Mount Lemmon || Mount Lemmon Survey ||  || align=right | 1.3 km || 
|-id=871 bgcolor=#E9E9E9
| 526871 ||  || — || March 11, 2007 || Catalina || CSS ||  || align=right | 1.3 km || 
|-id=872 bgcolor=#C2FFFF
| 526872 ||  || — || March 14, 2007 || Kitt Peak || Spacewatch || L5 || align=right | 6.9 km || 
|-id=873 bgcolor=#E9E9E9
| 526873 ||  || — || March 13, 2007 || Mount Lemmon || Mount Lemmon Survey ||  || align=right | 2.1 km || 
|-id=874 bgcolor=#E9E9E9
| 526874 ||  || — || March 14, 2007 || Mount Lemmon || Mount Lemmon Survey ||  || align=right | 2.2 km || 
|-id=875 bgcolor=#E9E9E9
| 526875 ||  || — || March 9, 2007 || Mount Lemmon || Mount Lemmon Survey ||  || align=right data-sort-value="0.85" | 850 m || 
|-id=876 bgcolor=#E9E9E9
| 526876 ||  || — || March 10, 2007 || Mount Lemmon || Mount Lemmon Survey ||  || align=right | 1.1 km || 
|-id=877 bgcolor=#fefefe
| 526877 ||  || — || March 13, 2007 || Mount Lemmon || Mount Lemmon Survey ||  || align=right data-sort-value="0.78" | 780 m || 
|-id=878 bgcolor=#FFC2E0
| 526878 ||  || — || March 16, 2007 || Catalina || CSS || APOPHA || align=right data-sort-value="0.47" | 470 m || 
|-id=879 bgcolor=#E9E9E9
| 526879 ||  || — || March 19, 2007 || Mount Lemmon || Mount Lemmon Survey ||  || align=right | 2.1 km || 
|-id=880 bgcolor=#E9E9E9
| 526880 ||  || — || March 19, 2007 || Mount Lemmon || Mount Lemmon Survey ||  || align=right data-sort-value="0.81" | 810 m || 
|-id=881 bgcolor=#E9E9E9
| 526881 ||  || — || March 9, 2007 || Mount Lemmon || Mount Lemmon Survey ||  || align=right | 2.1 km || 
|-id=882 bgcolor=#d6d6d6
| 526882 ||  || — || March 20, 2007 || Catalina || CSS ||  || align=right | 3.6 km || 
|-id=883 bgcolor=#E9E9E9
| 526883 ||  || — || March 26, 2003 || Kitt Peak || Spacewatch ||  || align=right data-sort-value="0.62" | 620 m || 
|-id=884 bgcolor=#E9E9E9
| 526884 ||  || — || March 10, 2007 || Kitt Peak || Spacewatch ||  || align=right data-sort-value="0.69" | 690 m || 
|-id=885 bgcolor=#E9E9E9
| 526885 ||  || — || March 28, 2007 || Siding Spring || SSS ||  || align=right | 1.9 km || 
|-id=886 bgcolor=#E9E9E9
| 526886 ||  || — || March 26, 2007 || Mount Lemmon || Mount Lemmon Survey ||  || align=right | 1.7 km || 
|-id=887 bgcolor=#E9E9E9
| 526887 ||  || — || March 26, 2007 || Mount Lemmon || Mount Lemmon Survey ||  || align=right data-sort-value="0.65" | 650 m || 
|-id=888 bgcolor=#fefefe
| 526888 ||  || — || March 20, 2007 || Catalina || CSS || H || align=right data-sort-value="0.56" | 560 m || 
|-id=889 bgcolor=#B88A00
| 526889 ||  || — || April 10, 2007 || Črni Vrh || Črni Vrh || unusual || align=right | 6.9 km || 
|-id=890 bgcolor=#E9E9E9
| 526890 ||  || — || April 11, 2003 || Kitt Peak || Spacewatch ||  || align=right | 1.3 km || 
|-id=891 bgcolor=#E9E9E9
| 526891 ||  || — || April 14, 2007 || Kitt Peak || Spacewatch ||  || align=right data-sort-value="0.78" | 780 m || 
|-id=892 bgcolor=#fefefe
| 526892 ||  || — || April 14, 2007 || Mount Lemmon || Mount Lemmon Survey || H || align=right data-sort-value="0.50" | 500 m || 
|-id=893 bgcolor=#FA8072
| 526893 ||  || — || April 14, 2007 || Kitt Peak || Spacewatch ||  || align=right data-sort-value="0.30" | 300 m || 
|-id=894 bgcolor=#E9E9E9
| 526894 ||  || — || April 15, 2007 || Kitt Peak || Spacewatch ||  || align=right | 2.2 km || 
|-id=895 bgcolor=#E9E9E9
| 526895 ||  || — || March 15, 2007 || Mount Lemmon || Mount Lemmon Survey ||  || align=right | 2.0 km || 
|-id=896 bgcolor=#E9E9E9
| 526896 ||  || — || March 16, 2007 || Mount Lemmon || Mount Lemmon Survey || (194) || align=right data-sort-value="0.89" | 890 m || 
|-id=897 bgcolor=#E9E9E9
| 526897 ||  || — || April 14, 2007 || Mount Lemmon || Mount Lemmon Survey ||  || align=right data-sort-value="0.99" | 990 m || 
|-id=898 bgcolor=#FFC2E0
| 526898 ||  || — || April 16, 2007 || Mount Lemmon || Mount Lemmon Survey || APOcritical || align=right data-sort-value="0.27" | 270 m || 
|-id=899 bgcolor=#E9E9E9
| 526899 ||  || — || April 16, 2007 || Mount Lemmon || Mount Lemmon Survey ||  || align=right | 2.3 km || 
|-id=900 bgcolor=#C2FFFF
| 526900 ||  || — || February 26, 2007 || Mount Lemmon || Mount Lemmon Survey || L5(17492) || align=right | 8.2 km || 
|}

526901–527000 

|-bgcolor=#E9E9E9
| 526901 ||  || — || April 18, 2007 || Kitt Peak || Spacewatch || EUN || align=right data-sort-value="0.88" | 880 m || 
|-id=902 bgcolor=#E9E9E9
| 526902 ||  || — || April 11, 2007 || Kitt Peak || Spacewatch ||  || align=right | 1.3 km || 
|-id=903 bgcolor=#E9E9E9
| 526903 ||  || — || April 22, 2007 || Mount Lemmon || Mount Lemmon Survey ||  || align=right | 1.5 km || 
|-id=904 bgcolor=#E9E9E9
| 526904 ||  || — || April 20, 2007 || Kitt Peak || Spacewatch ||  || align=right | 2.2 km || 
|-id=905 bgcolor=#fefefe
| 526905 ||  || — || March 14, 2007 || Mount Lemmon || Mount Lemmon Survey || H || align=right data-sort-value="0.51" | 510 m || 
|-id=906 bgcolor=#E9E9E9
| 526906 ||  || — || March 20, 2007 || Kitt Peak || Spacewatch ||  || align=right data-sort-value="0.76" | 760 m || 
|-id=907 bgcolor=#fefefe
| 526907 ||  || — || April 22, 2007 || Kitt Peak || Spacewatch || H || align=right data-sort-value="0.56" | 560 m || 
|-id=908 bgcolor=#E9E9E9
| 526908 ||  || — || April 14, 2007 || Kitt Peak || Spacewatch ||  || align=right data-sort-value="0.95" | 950 m || 
|-id=909 bgcolor=#E9E9E9
| 526909 ||  || — || April 25, 2007 || Mount Lemmon || Mount Lemmon Survey || LEO || align=right | 1.5 km || 
|-id=910 bgcolor=#E9E9E9
| 526910 ||  || — || April 14, 2007 || Mount Lemmon || Mount Lemmon Survey ||  || align=right | 1.4 km || 
|-id=911 bgcolor=#E9E9E9
| 526911 ||  || — || March 26, 2007 || Kitt Peak || Spacewatch ||  || align=right data-sort-value="0.68" | 680 m || 
|-id=912 bgcolor=#E9E9E9
| 526912 ||  || — || March 15, 2007 || Mount Lemmon || Mount Lemmon Survey ||  || align=right data-sort-value="0.82" | 820 m || 
|-id=913 bgcolor=#E9E9E9
| 526913 ||  || — || April 24, 2007 || Kitt Peak || Spacewatch ||  || align=right data-sort-value="0.91" | 910 m || 
|-id=914 bgcolor=#fefefe
| 526914 ||  || — || April 25, 2007 || Mount Lemmon || Mount Lemmon Survey ||  || align=right data-sort-value="0.76" | 760 m || 
|-id=915 bgcolor=#E9E9E9
| 526915 ||  || — || April 24, 2007 || Mount Lemmon || Mount Lemmon Survey ||  || align=right | 1.3 km || 
|-id=916 bgcolor=#E9E9E9
| 526916 ||  || — || May 7, 2007 || Mount Lemmon || Mount Lemmon Survey ||  || align=right data-sort-value="0.81" | 810 m || 
|-id=917 bgcolor=#E9E9E9
| 526917 ||  || — || March 16, 2007 || Mount Lemmon || Mount Lemmon Survey ||  || align=right | 1.3 km || 
|-id=918 bgcolor=#FA8072
| 526918 ||  || — || May 10, 2007 || Mount Lemmon || Mount Lemmon Survey ||  || align=right data-sort-value="0.91" | 910 m || 
|-id=919 bgcolor=#E9E9E9
| 526919 ||  || — || May 8, 2007 || Kitt Peak || Spacewatch || (10369) || align=right | 2.5 km || 
|-id=920 bgcolor=#E9E9E9
| 526920 ||  || — || April 19, 2007 || Mount Lemmon || Mount Lemmon Survey || (194) || align=right data-sort-value="0.89" | 890 m || 
|-id=921 bgcolor=#E9E9E9
| 526921 ||  || — || March 13, 2007 || Kitt Peak || Spacewatch ||  || align=right | 1.7 km || 
|-id=922 bgcolor=#E9E9E9
| 526922 ||  || — || April 11, 2007 || Mount Lemmon || Mount Lemmon Survey ||  || align=right | 1.5 km || 
|-id=923 bgcolor=#E9E9E9
| 526923 ||  || — || April 22, 2007 || Siding Spring || SSS ||  || align=right | 1.2 km || 
|-id=924 bgcolor=#E9E9E9
| 526924 ||  || — || May 13, 2007 || Mount Lemmon || Mount Lemmon Survey ||  || align=right | 1.8 km || 
|-id=925 bgcolor=#E9E9E9
| 526925 ||  || — || May 25, 2007 || Mount Lemmon || Mount Lemmon Survey ||  || align=right | 2.0 km || 
|-id=926 bgcolor=#E9E9E9
| 526926 ||  || — || May 26, 2007 || Mount Lemmon || Mount Lemmon Survey ||  || align=right | 1.8 km || 
|-id=927 bgcolor=#E9E9E9
| 526927 ||  || — || March 25, 2007 || Mount Lemmon || Mount Lemmon Survey ||  || align=right | 1.3 km || 
|-id=928 bgcolor=#d6d6d6
| 526928 ||  || — || March 25, 2007 || Mount Lemmon || Mount Lemmon Survey ||  || align=right | 2.7 km || 
|-id=929 bgcolor=#E9E9E9
| 526929 ||  || — || June 12, 2007 || Reedy Creek || J. Broughton ||  || align=right | 2.8 km || 
|-id=930 bgcolor=#E9E9E9
| 526930 ||  || — || May 12, 2007 || Kitt Peak || Spacewatch ||  || align=right data-sort-value="0.82" | 820 m || 
|-id=931 bgcolor=#E9E9E9
| 526931 ||  || — || June 12, 2007 || Kitt Peak || Spacewatch ||  || align=right data-sort-value="0.93" | 930 m || 
|-id=932 bgcolor=#E9E9E9
| 526932 ||  || — || June 14, 2007 || Kitt Peak || Spacewatch ||  || align=right data-sort-value="0.85" | 850 m || 
|-id=933 bgcolor=#d6d6d6
| 526933 ||  || — || June 16, 2007 || Kitt Peak || Spacewatch ||  || align=right | 3.0 km || 
|-id=934 bgcolor=#E9E9E9
| 526934 ||  || — || June 21, 2007 || Mount Lemmon || Mount Lemmon Survey ||  || align=right | 2.2 km || 
|-id=935 bgcolor=#d6d6d6
| 526935 ||  || — || June 20, 2007 || Kitt Peak || Spacewatch ||  || align=right | 2.5 km || 
|-id=936 bgcolor=#E9E9E9
| 526936 ||  || — || June 24, 2007 || Catalina || CSS ||  || align=right | 2.2 km || 
|-id=937 bgcolor=#FA8072
| 526937 ||  || — || July 17, 2007 || Eskridge || G. Hug ||  || align=right data-sort-value="0.69" | 690 m || 
|-id=938 bgcolor=#E9E9E9
| 526938 ||  || — || July 19, 2007 || Mount Lemmon || Mount Lemmon Survey ||  || align=right | 2.0 km || 
|-id=939 bgcolor=#E9E9E9
| 526939 ||  || — || July 18, 2007 || Mount Lemmon || Mount Lemmon Survey ||  || align=right | 1.3 km || 
|-id=940 bgcolor=#FA8072
| 526940 ||  || — || August 5, 2007 || Reedy Creek || J. Broughton || unusual || align=right | 2.7 km || 
|-id=941 bgcolor=#fefefe
| 526941 ||  || — || August 9, 2007 || Dauban || Chante-Perdrix Obs. ||  || align=right data-sort-value="0.84" | 840 m || 
|-id=942 bgcolor=#fefefe
| 526942 ||  || — || August 9, 2007 || Socorro || LINEAR || H || align=right data-sort-value="0.71" | 710 m || 
|-id=943 bgcolor=#fefefe
| 526943 ||  || — || August 8, 2007 || Socorro || LINEAR ||  || align=right data-sort-value="0.77" | 770 m || 
|-id=944 bgcolor=#fefefe
| 526944 ||  || — || August 9, 2007 || Socorro || LINEAR ||  || align=right data-sort-value="0.77" | 770 m || 
|-id=945 bgcolor=#E9E9E9
| 526945 ||  || — || August 12, 2007 || Socorro || LINEAR ||  || align=right | 1.0 km || 
|-id=946 bgcolor=#fefefe
| 526946 ||  || — || August 10, 2007 || Kitt Peak || Spacewatch ||  || align=right data-sort-value="0.65" | 650 m || 
|-id=947 bgcolor=#FA8072
| 526947 ||  || — || July 17, 2007 || Catalina || CSS ||  || align=right data-sort-value="0.86" | 860 m || 
|-id=948 bgcolor=#d6d6d6
| 526948 ||  || — || August 10, 2007 || Kitt Peak || Spacewatch ||  || align=right | 2.7 km || 
|-id=949 bgcolor=#d6d6d6
| 526949 ||  || — || August 10, 2007 || Kitt Peak || Spacewatch ||  || align=right | 2.9 km || 
|-id=950 bgcolor=#fefefe
| 526950 ||  || — || March 24, 1995 || Kitt Peak || Spacewatch ||  || align=right | 1.0 km || 
|-id=951 bgcolor=#E9E9E9
| 526951 ||  || — || August 21, 2007 || Anderson Mesa || LONEOS ||  || align=right | 1.8 km || 
|-id=952 bgcolor=#E9E9E9
| 526952 ||  || — || August 23, 2007 || Kitt Peak || Spacewatch ||  || align=right | 1.4 km || 
|-id=953 bgcolor=#d6d6d6
| 526953 ||  || — || August 23, 2007 || Kitt Peak || Spacewatch ||  || align=right | 1.9 km || 
|-id=954 bgcolor=#d6d6d6
| 526954 ||  || — || September 3, 2007 || Catalina || CSS ||  || align=right | 2.5 km || 
|-id=955 bgcolor=#d6d6d6
| 526955 ||  || — || August 23, 2007 || Kitt Peak || Spacewatch ||  || align=right | 2.6 km || 
|-id=956 bgcolor=#fefefe
| 526956 ||  || — || September 3, 2007 || Catalina || CSS ||  || align=right data-sort-value="0.74" | 740 m || 
|-id=957 bgcolor=#fefefe
| 526957 ||  || — || September 12, 2007 || Catalina || CSS ||  || align=right | 1.1 km || 
|-id=958 bgcolor=#fefefe
| 526958 ||  || — || September 11, 2007 || Kitt Peak || Spacewatch || NYS || align=right data-sort-value="0.63" | 630 m || 
|-id=959 bgcolor=#fefefe
| 526959 ||  || — || August 22, 2007 || Anderson Mesa || LONEOS || NYS || align=right data-sort-value="0.60" | 600 m || 
|-id=960 bgcolor=#fefefe
| 526960 ||  || — || August 10, 2007 || Kitt Peak || Spacewatch ||  || align=right data-sort-value="0.68" | 680 m || 
|-id=961 bgcolor=#d6d6d6
| 526961 ||  || — || September 4, 2007 || Mount Lemmon || Mount Lemmon Survey || THM || align=right | 2.0 km || 
|-id=962 bgcolor=#d6d6d6
| 526962 ||  || — || August 17, 2007 || XuYi || PMO NEO ||  || align=right | 3.1 km || 
|-id=963 bgcolor=#fefefe
| 526963 ||  || — || September 5, 2007 || Anderson Mesa || LONEOS ||  || align=right | 1.0 km || 
|-id=964 bgcolor=#FA8072
| 526964 ||  || — || September 5, 2007 || Anderson Mesa || LONEOS ||  || align=right | 1.1 km || 
|-id=965 bgcolor=#fefefe
| 526965 ||  || — || September 8, 2007 || Bergisch Gladbach || W. Bickel ||  || align=right data-sort-value="0.62" | 620 m || 
|-id=966 bgcolor=#d6d6d6
| 526966 ||  || — || September 8, 2007 || Mount Lemmon || Mount Lemmon Survey ||  || align=right | 3.1 km || 
|-id=967 bgcolor=#d6d6d6
| 526967 ||  || — || September 8, 2007 || Anderson Mesa || LONEOS ||  || align=right | 2.3 km || 
|-id=968 bgcolor=#d6d6d6
| 526968 ||  || — || September 8, 2007 || Anderson Mesa || LONEOS ||  || align=right | 2.3 km || 
|-id=969 bgcolor=#d6d6d6
| 526969 ||  || — || September 9, 2007 || Kitt Peak || Spacewatch ||  || align=right | 2.9 km || 
|-id=970 bgcolor=#fefefe
| 526970 ||  || — || September 9, 2007 || Kitt Peak || Spacewatch || V || align=right data-sort-value="0.59" | 590 m || 
|-id=971 bgcolor=#fefefe
| 526971 ||  || — || September 9, 2007 || Kitt Peak || Spacewatch ||  || align=right data-sort-value="0.62" | 620 m || 
|-id=972 bgcolor=#d6d6d6
| 526972 ||  || — || September 9, 2007 || Mount Lemmon || Mount Lemmon Survey || Tj (2.99) || align=right | 3.5 km || 
|-id=973 bgcolor=#fefefe
| 526973 ||  || — || September 9, 2007 || Mount Lemmon || Mount Lemmon Survey ||  || align=right data-sort-value="0.80" | 800 m || 
|-id=974 bgcolor=#d6d6d6
| 526974 ||  || — || September 9, 2007 || Kitt Peak || Spacewatch ||  || align=right | 3.1 km || 
|-id=975 bgcolor=#fefefe
| 526975 ||  || — || September 9, 2007 || Kitt Peak || Spacewatch ||  || align=right data-sort-value="0.53" | 530 m || 
|-id=976 bgcolor=#fefefe
| 526976 ||  || — || September 9, 2007 || Kitt Peak || Spacewatch ||  || align=right data-sort-value="0.57" | 570 m || 
|-id=977 bgcolor=#d6d6d6
| 526977 ||  || — || September 9, 2007 || Kitt Peak || Spacewatch ||  || align=right | 2.6 km || 
|-id=978 bgcolor=#fefefe
| 526978 ||  || — || September 10, 2007 || Catalina || CSS ||  || align=right data-sort-value="0.76" | 760 m || 
|-id=979 bgcolor=#fefefe
| 526979 ||  || — || August 10, 2007 || Kitt Peak || Spacewatch ||  || align=right data-sort-value="0.59" | 590 m || 
|-id=980 bgcolor=#d6d6d6
| 526980 ||  || — || September 10, 2007 || Mount Lemmon || Mount Lemmon Survey ||  || align=right | 2.1 km || 
|-id=981 bgcolor=#fefefe
| 526981 ||  || — || September 10, 2007 || Kitt Peak || Spacewatch ||  || align=right data-sort-value="0.61" | 610 m || 
|-id=982 bgcolor=#d6d6d6
| 526982 ||  || — || September 10, 2007 || Kitt Peak || Spacewatch ||  || align=right | 2.1 km || 
|-id=983 bgcolor=#E9E9E9
| 526983 ||  || — || September 10, 2007 || Kitt Peak || Spacewatch || MIS || align=right | 1.7 km || 
|-id=984 bgcolor=#d6d6d6
| 526984 ||  || — || September 10, 2007 || Mount Lemmon || Mount Lemmon Survey ||  || align=right | 3.1 km || 
|-id=985 bgcolor=#fefefe
| 526985 ||  || — || September 3, 2007 || Catalina || CSS ||  || align=right data-sort-value="0.49" | 490 m || 
|-id=986 bgcolor=#fefefe
| 526986 ||  || — || September 10, 2007 || Mount Lemmon || Mount Lemmon Survey ||  || align=right data-sort-value="0.98" | 980 m || 
|-id=987 bgcolor=#d6d6d6
| 526987 ||  || — || April 8, 2006 || Kitt Peak || Spacewatch ||  || align=right | 2.4 km || 
|-id=988 bgcolor=#fefefe
| 526988 ||  || — || September 10, 2007 || Mount Lemmon || Mount Lemmon Survey ||  || align=right data-sort-value="0.55" | 550 m || 
|-id=989 bgcolor=#fefefe
| 526989 ||  || — || September 10, 2007 || Kitt Peak || Spacewatch || NYS || align=right data-sort-value="0.67" | 670 m || 
|-id=990 bgcolor=#fefefe
| 526990 ||  || — || September 11, 2007 || Kitt Peak || Spacewatch ||  || align=right data-sort-value="0.58" | 580 m || 
|-id=991 bgcolor=#d6d6d6
| 526991 ||  || — || September 11, 2007 || Kitt Peak || Spacewatch ||  || align=right | 2.3 km || 
|-id=992 bgcolor=#fefefe
| 526992 ||  || — || September 11, 2007 || Kitt Peak || Spacewatch ||  || align=right data-sort-value="0.60" | 600 m || 
|-id=993 bgcolor=#d6d6d6
| 526993 ||  || — || September 11, 2007 || Kitt Peak || Spacewatch ||  || align=right | 2.2 km || 
|-id=994 bgcolor=#d6d6d6
| 526994 ||  || — || September 11, 2007 || Kitt Peak || Spacewatch || EOS || align=right | 1.6 km || 
|-id=995 bgcolor=#d6d6d6
| 526995 ||  || — || September 11, 2007 || Kitt Peak || Spacewatch ||  || align=right | 4.1 km || 
|-id=996 bgcolor=#fefefe
| 526996 ||  || — || September 11, 2007 || Mount Lemmon || Mount Lemmon Survey ||  || align=right data-sort-value="0.68" | 680 m || 
|-id=997 bgcolor=#E9E9E9
| 526997 Hohai ||  ||  || September 11, 2007 || XuYi || PMO NEO || EUN || align=right | 1.2 km || 
|-id=998 bgcolor=#E9E9E9
| 526998 ||  || — || September 12, 2007 || Catalina || CSS || EUN || align=right | 1.2 km || 
|-id=999 bgcolor=#d6d6d6
| 526999 ||  || — || September 12, 2007 || Mount Lemmon || Mount Lemmon Survey ||  || align=right | 2.8 km || 
|-id=000 bgcolor=#fefefe
| 527000 ||  || — || September 8, 2007 || Anderson Mesa || LONEOS || NYS || align=right data-sort-value="0.69" | 690 m || 
|}

References

External links 
 Discovery Circumstances: Numbered Minor Planets (525001)–(530000) (IAU Minor Planet Center)

0526